The People's Republic of China is officially an atheist state, but the government formally recognizes four religions: Buddhism, Taoism, Christianity (Catholicism and Protestantism) and Islam. In the early 21st century, there has been increasing official recognition of Confucianism and Chinese folk religion as part of China's cultural inheritance. Chinese civilization has historically long been a cradle and host to a variety of the most enduring religio-philosophical traditions of the world. Confucianism and Taoism (Daoism), later joined by Buddhism, constitute the "three teachings" that have shaped Chinese culture. There are no clear boundaries between these intertwined religious systems, which do not claim to be exclusive, and elements of each enrich popular or folk religion. The emperors of China claimed the Mandate of Heaven and participated in Chinese religious practices. In the early 20th century, reform-minded officials and intellectuals attacked all religions as "superstitious"; since 1949, China has been governed by the CCP, a Marxist–Leninist atheist institution that prohibits party members from practicing religion while in office. In the culmination of a series of atheistic and anti-religious campaigns already underway since the late 19th century, the Cultural Revolution against old habits, ideas, customs, and culture, lasting from 1966 to 1976, destroyed or forced them underground. Under subsequent leaders, religious organisations have been given more autonomy.

Folk or popular religion, the most widespread system of beliefs and practices, has evolved and adapted since at least the Shang and Zhou dynasties in the second millennium BCE. Fundamental elements of a theology and spiritual explanation for the nature of the universe harken back to this period and were further elaborated in the Axial Age. Basically, Chinese religion involves allegiance to the shen, often translated as "spirits", defining a variety of gods and immortals. These may be deities of the natural environment or ancestral principles of human groups, concepts of civility, culture heroes, many of whom feature in Chinese mythology and history. Confucian philosophy and religious practice began their long evolution during the later Zhou; Taoist institutionalized religions developed by the Han dynasty; Chinese Buddhism became widely popular by the Tang dynasty, and in response Confucian thinkers developed neo-Confucian philosophies; and popular movements of salvation and local cults thrived.

Christianity and Islam arrived in China in the 7th century. Christianity did not take root until it was reintroduced in the 16th century by Jesuit missionaries. In the early 20th century Christian communities grew, but after 1949, foreign missionaries were expelled, and churches brought under government-controlled institutions. After the late 1970s, religious freedoms for Christians improved and new Chinese groups emerged. Islam has been practiced in Chinese society for 1,400 years. Currently, Muslims are a minority group in China, representing between 0.45% to 1.8% of the total population according to the latest estimates. Though Hui Muslims are the most numerous group, the greatest concentration of Muslims is in Xinjiang, with a significant Uyghur population. China is also often considered a home to humanism and secularism, with these ideologies beginning to take hold in the area in the time of Confucius.

Because many Han Chinese do not consider their spiritual beliefs and practices to be a "religion" and do not feel that they must practice any one of them exclusively, it is difficult to gather clear and reliable statistics. According to scholarly opinion, "the great majority of China's population of 1 billion" takes part in Chinese cosmological religion, its rituals and festivals of the lunar calendar, without belonging to any institutional teaching. National surveys conducted in the early 21st century estimated that some 80% of the population of China, which is more than a billion people, practice some kind of Chinese folk religion; 13–16% are Buddhists; 10% are Taoist; 2.53% are Christians; and 0.83% are Muslims. Folk religious movements of salvation constitute 2–3% to 13% of the population, while many in the intellectual class adhere to Confucianism as a religious identity. In addition, ethnic minority groups practice distinctive religions, including Tibetan Buddhism, and Islam among the Hui and Uyghur peoples.

History

Proto-Chinese and Xia-Shang-Zhou culture

Prior to the formation of Chinese civilisation and the spread of world religions in the region known today as East Asia (which includes the territorial boundaries of modern-day China), local tribes shared animistic, shamanic and totemic worldviews. Mediatory individuals such as shamans communicated prayers, sacrifices or offerings directly to the spiritual world, a heritage that survives in some modern forms of Chinese religion.

Ancient shamanism is especially connected to ancient Neolithic cultures such as the Hongshan culture. The Flemish philosopher Ulrich Libbrecht traces the origins of some features of Taoism to what Jan Jakob Maria de Groot called "Wuism", that is Chinese shamanism.

Libbrecht distinguishes two layers in the development of the Chinese theology and religion that continues to this day, traditions derived respectively from the Shang (1600–1046 BCE) and subsequent Zhou dynasties (1046–256 BCE). The religion of the Shang was based on the worship of ancestors and god-kings, who survived as unseen divine forces after death. They were not transcendent entities, since the universe was "by itself so", not created by a force outside of it but generated by internal rhythms and cosmic powers. The royal ancestors were called di, "deities", and the utmost progenitor was Shangdi ( "Highest Deity"). Shangdi is identified with the dragon, symbol of the unlimited power (qi), of the "protean" primordial power which embodies yin and yang in unity, associated to the constellation Draco which winds around the north ecliptic pole, and slithers between the Little and Big Dipper (or Great Chariot). Already in Shang theology, the multiplicity of gods of nature and ancestors were viewed as parts of Di, and the four  fāng ("directions" or "sides") and their  fēng ("winds") as his cosmic will.

The Zhou dynasty, which overthrew the Shang, was more rooted in an agricultural worldview, and they emphasised a more universal idea of Tian ( "Heaven"). The Shang dynasty's identification of Shangdi as their ancestor-god had asserted their claim to power by divine right; the Zhou transformed this claim into a legitimacy based on moral power, the Mandate of Heaven. In Zhou theology, Tian had no singular earthly progeny, but bestowed divine favour on virtuous rulers. Zhou kings declared that their victory over the Shang was because they were virtuous and loved their people, while the Shang were tyrants and thus were deprived of power by Tian.

John C. Didier and David Pankenier relate the shapes of both the ancient Chinese characters for Di and Tian to the patterns of stars in the northern skies, either drawn, in Didier's theory by connecting the constellations bracketing the north celestial pole as a square, or in Pankenier's theory by connecting some of the stars which form the constellations of the Big Dipper and broader Ursa Major, and Ursa Minor (Little Dipper). Cultures in other parts of the world have also conceived these stars or constellations as symbols of the origin of things, the supreme godhead, divinity and royal power.

Latter Zhou and Warring States

By the 6th century BCE the power of Tian and the symbols that represented it on earth (architecture of cities, temples, altars and ritual cauldrons, and the Zhou ritual system) became "diffuse" and claimed by different potentates in the Zhou states to legitimise economic, political, and military ambitions. Divine right no longer was an exclusive privilege of the Zhou royal house, but might be bought by anyone able to afford the elaborate ceremonies and the old and new rites required to access the authority of Tian.

Besides the waning Zhou ritual system, what may be defined as "wild" ( yě) traditions, or traditions "outside of the official system", developed as attempts to access the will of Tian. The population had lost faith in the official tradition, which was no longer perceived as an effective way to communicate with Heaven. The traditions of the "Nine Fields" ( Jiǔyě) and of the Yijing flourished. Chinese thinkers, faced with this challenge to legitimacy, diverged in a "Hundred Schools of Thought", each proposing its own theories for the reconstruction of the Zhou moral order.

Background of Confucian thought

Confucius (551–479 BCE) appeared in this period of political decadence and spiritual questioning. He was educated in Shang-Zhou theology, which he contributed to transmit and reformulate giving centrality to self-cultivation and human agency, and the educational power of the self-established individual in assisting others to establish themselves (the principle of  àirén, "loving others"). As the Zhou reign collapsed, traditional values were abandoned resulting in a period of moral decline. Confucius saw an opportunity to reinforce values of compassion and tradition into society. Disillusioned with the widespread vulgarisation of the rituals to access Tian, he began to preach an ethical interpretation of traditional Zhou religion. In his view, the power of Tian is immanent, and responds positively to the sincere heart driven by humaneness and rightness, decency and altruism. Confucius conceived these qualities as the foundation needed to restore socio-political harmony. Like many contemporaries, Confucius saw ritual practices as efficacious ways to access Tian, but he thought that the crucial knot was the state of meditation that participants enter prior to engage in the ritual acts. Confucius amended and recodified the classical books inherited from the Xia-Shang-Zhou dynasties, and composed the Spring and Autumn Annals.

Philosophers in the Warring States compiled in the Analects, and formulated the classical metaphysics which became the lash of Confucianism. In accordance with the Master, they identified mental tranquility as the state of Tian, or the One (一 Yī), which in each individual is the Heaven-bestowed divine power to rule one's own life and the world. Going beyond the Master, they theorised the oneness of production and reabsorption into the cosmic source, and the possibility to understand and therefore reattain it through meditation. This line of thought would have influenced all Chinese individual and collective-political mystical theories and practices thereafter.

According to Zhou Youguang, Confucianism's name in Chinese, basically  rú, originally referred to shamanic methods of holding rites and existed before Confucius' times, but with Confucius it came to mean devotion to propagating such teachings to bring civilisation to the people. Confucianism was initiated by Confucius, developed by Mencius (~372–289 BCE) and inherited by later generations, undergoing constant transformations and restructuring since its establishment, but preserving the principles of humaneness and righteousness at its core.

Qin and Han dynasties

The Qin (221–206 BCE), and especially Han dynasty (206 BCE–220 CE), inherited the philosophical developments of the Warring States period molding them into a universalistic philosophy, cosmology and religion. It was in this period that religious focus shifted to the Earth ( Dì), regarded as representative of Heaven's (celestial pole's) power. In the Han period, the philosophical concern was especially the crucial role of the human being on earth, completing the cosmological trinity of Heaven-Earth-humanity ( Tiāndìrén). Han philosophers conceived the immanent virtue of Tian as working through earth and humanity to complete the  yǔzhòu ("space-time").

The short-lived Qin dynasty, started by Qin Shi Huang (r. 247–220 BCE), who reunified the Warring States and was the first Chinese ruler to use the title of "emperor", chose Legalism as the state ideology, banning and persecuting all other schools of thought. Confucianism was harshly suppressed, with the burning of Confucian classics and killing of scholars who espoused the Confucian cause. The state ritual of the Qin was indeed similar to that of the following Han dynasty. Qin Shihuang personally held sacrifices to Di at Mount Tai, a site dedicated to the worship of the supreme God since pre-Xia times, and in the suburbs of the capital Xianyang. The emperors of Qin also concentrated the cults of the five forms of God, previously held at different locations, in unified temple complexes.

The universal religion of the Han, which became connected at an early time with the proto-Taoist Huang–Lao movement, was focused on the idea of the incarnation of God as the Yellow Emperor, the central one of the "Five Forms of the Highest Deity" ( Wǔfāng Shàngdì). The idea of the incarnation of God was not new, as already the Shang royal lineage regarded themselves as divine. Their progenitors were "sons of God", born by women who "stepped on the imprinting" of Di. This was also true for royal ancestors of the early Zhou dynasty. The difference rests upon the fact that the Yellow Emperor was no longer an exclusive ancestor of some royal lineage, but rather a more universal archetype of the human being. The competing factions of the Confucians and the fāngshì ( "masters of directions"), regarded as representatives of the ancient religious tradition inherited from previous dynasties, concurred in the formulation of Han state religion, the former pushing for a centralisation of religio-political power around the worship of the God of Heaven by the emperor, while the latter emphasising the multiplicity of the local gods and the theology of the Yellow Emperor. Besides these developments of common Chinese and Confucian state religion, the latter Han dynasty was characterised by new religious phenomena: the emergence of Taoism outside state orthodoxy, the rise of indigenous millenarian religious movements, and the introduction of the foreign religion of Buddhism.

Yellow Emperor cult

By the Han dynasty, the universal God of early Shang-Zhou theology had found a new expression with the use of the names of Tàiyǐ ( "Great Oneness"), "Supreme Oneness of the Central Yellow" ( Zhōnghuáng Tàiyǐ), or the "Yellow God of the Northern Dipper (i.e. Ursa Major)" ( Huángshén Běidǒu), other than by names inherited from the previous tradition. Although the name "Taiyi" became prominent in the Han, it harkens back to the Warring States, as attested in the poem The Supreme Oneness Gives Birth to Water, and possibly to the Shang dynasty as Dàyī ( "Big Oneness"), an alternative name for Shangs' (and universe's) greatest ancestor. Han theology focalised on the Yellow Emperor, a culture hero and creator of civility, who, according to a definition in apocryphal texts related to the Hétú , "proceeds from the essence of the Yellow God of the Northern Dipper", is born to "a daughter of a chthonic deity", and as such he is "a cosmic product of the conflation of Heaven and Earth".

In the myth, the Yellow Emperor was conceived by a virgin mother, Fubao, who was impregnated by Taiyi's radiance (yuanqi, "primordial pneuma") from the Big Dipper after she gazed at it. Through his human side, he was a descendant of  Yǒuxióng, the lineage of the Bear (another reference to the Ursa Major). Didier has studied the parallels that the Yellow Emperor's mythology has in other cultures, deducing a plausible ancient origin of the myth in Siberia or in north Asia.

In latter Han-dynasty description of the cosmology of the five forms of God by Sima Qian, it is important that the Yellow Emperor was portrayed as the grandfather of the Black Emperor ( Hēidì) of the north who personifies as well the pole stars, and as the tamer of the Flaming Emperor ( Yándì, otherwise known as the "Red Emperor"), his half-brother, who is the spirit of the southern Chinese populations known collectively as Chu in the Zhou dynasty.

Emperor Wu of Han (142–87 BCE), under the influence of the scholar Dong Zhongshu (who incorporated into Confucianism the man-focused developments of the common religion, formulating the doctrine of the Interactions Between Heaven and Mankind), and of prominent fangshi, officially integrated the Confucian state religion and ritual inherited from the erstwhile dynasties with the theology of Taiyi, while outside the state religion the Yellow God was the focus of Huang-Lao religious movements which influenced the primitive Taoist Church. Before the Confucian turn of Emperor Wu and after him, the early and latter Han dynasty had Huang-Lao as the state doctrine under various emperors; in Huang-Lao, the philosopher-god Laozi was identified as the Yellow Emperor and received imperial sacrifices, for instance by Emperor Huan (146-168).

Popular millenarian and early Taoist churches in later Han period

The latter Eastern Han dynasty (25–220 CE) struggled with both internal instability and menace by non-Chinese peoples from the outer edges of the empire. Prospects for a better personal life and salvation appealed to the masses who were periodically hit by natural disasters and galvanised by uprisings organised by self-proclaimed "kings" and "heirs". In such harsh conditions, while the imperial cult continued the sacrifices to the cosmological gods, common people estranged from the rationalism of the state religion found solace in enlightened masters and in reviving and perpetuating more or less abandoned cults of national, regional and local divinities that better represented indigenous identities. The Han state religion itself was "ethnicised" by associating the cosmological deities to regional populations.

By the end of the dynasty (206 BCE–8 CE) the earliest record of a mass religious movement attests the excitement provoked by the belief in the imminent advent of the Queen Mother of the West ( Xīwángmǔ) in the northeastern provinces (then Henan, Hebei and Shandong) in the first half of the year 3 BCE. Though the soteriological movement included improper and possibly reprehensive collective behavior, it was not crushed by the government. Indeed, from the elites' point of view, the movement was connected to a series of abnormal cosmic phenomena seen as characteristic of an excess of  yīn (femininity, sinister, reabsorption of the order of nature).

Between 184 and 205 CE, the Way of the Supreme Peace ( Tàipíngdào) in the Central Plains, the earliest attested popular Taoist religious-military movement led by members of the Zhang lineage—prominently Zhang Jue and Zhang Liu, among leaders from other families—, organised the so-called Yellow Turban Rebellion against the Han dynasty. Later Taoist religious movements flourished in the Han state of Shu (modern Sichuan). A  wū (shaman) of the Supreme Peace named Zhang Xiu was known to have led a group of followers from Shu into the uprising of the year 184. In 191 he reappeared as a military official in the province, together with the apparently unrelated Zhang Lu. During a military mission in Hanning (modern southwest Shaanxi), Xiu either died in battle or was killed by Lu himself, who incorporated Xiu's followers and seized the city, which he renamed Hanzhong. A characteristic of the territory governed by Lu was its significant non-Chinese population. Between 143 and 198, starting with the grandfather Zhang Daoling and culminating with Zhang Lu, the Zhang lineage had been organising the territory into dioceses or parishes, establishing a Taoist theocracy, the early Celestial Masters' Church (in Chinese variously called  Wǔdǒumǐdào, "Way of the Five Pecks of Rice", and later  Tiānshīdào, "Way of the Celestial Masters", or  Zhèngyīdào, "Way of the Orthodox Unity"). Zhang Lu died in 216 or 217, and between 215 and 219 the people of Hanzhong were gradually dispersed northwards, implanting Celestial Masters' Taoism in other parts of the empire.

Introduction of Buddhism 

Buddhism was introduced during the latter Han dynasty, and first mentioned in 65 CE. Liu Ying, a half brother of Emperor Ming of Han (57–75 CE) was one of the earliest Chinese adherents, at a time when the imported religion interacted with Huang-Lao proto-Taoism. China's earliest known Buddhist temple, the White Horse Temple, was established outside the walls of the capital Luoyang during Emperor Ming's reign.

Buddhism entered China via the Silk Road, transmitted by the Buddhist populations who inhabited the Western Regions (modern Xinjiang), then Indo-Europeans (predominantly Tocharians and Saka). It began to grow to become a significant influence in China proper only after the fall of the Han dynasty, in the period of political division. When Buddhism had become an established religion it began to compete with Chinese indigenous religion and Taoist movements, deprecatorily designated as Ways of Demons ( Guǐdào) in Buddhist polemical literature.

Six Dynasties period
After the fall of the Han dynasty, a period of disunity defined as the "Six Dynasties" began. After the first stage of the Three Kingdoms (220–280), China was partially unified under the Jin dynasty (266–420), while much of the north was governed by sixteen independent states. The fall of the Han capital Luoyang to the Xiongnu in 311 led the royal court and Celestial Masters' clerics to migrate southwards. Jiangnan became the center of the "southern tradition" of Celestial Masters' Taoism, which developed characteristic features, among which a meditation technique known as "guarding the One" (shouyi), that is visualising the unity God in the human organism.

Representatives of Jiangnan's indigenous religions responded to the spread of Celestial Masters' Taoism by reformulating their own traditions according to the imported religion. This led to the foundation of two new Taoist schools, with their own scriptural and ritual bodies: Shangqing Taoism ( Shàngqīngpài, "Highest Clarity school"), based on revelations that occurred between 364 and 370 in modern-day Nanjing, and Lingbao Taoism ( Língbǎopài, "Numinous Gem school"), based on revelations of the years between 397 and 402 and recodified later by Lu Xiujing (406-77). Lingbao incorporated from Buddhism the ideas of "universal salvation" and ranked "heavens", and focused on communal rituals.

Buddhism brought a model of afterlife to Chinese people and had a deep influence on Chinese culture. The story Mulian Rescues His Mother, for instance, is a parable dated back to the 3rd century, which adapts an originally Buddhist fable to show Confucian values of filial piety. In the story, a virtuous monk descends into hell to rescue his mother, who had been condemned for her transgressions.

Sui and Tang dynasties 
In the Tang dynasty (618–907) the concept of "Tian" became more common at the expense of "Di", continuing a tendency that started in the Han dynasty. Both also expanded their meanings, with "di" now more frequently used as suffix of a deity's name rather than to refer to the supreme power. "Tian", besides, became more associated to its meaning of "Heaven" as a paradise or the hierarchy of physical skies. The proliferation of foreign religions in the Tang, especially Buddhist sects, entailed that each of them conceived their own ideal "Heaven". "Tian" itself started to be used, linguistically, as an affix in composite names to mean "heavenly" or "divine". This was also the case in the Buddhist context, with many monasteries' names containing this element.

Under the influence of foreign cultures and thought systems, new concepts to refer to the supreme God were formulated, such as Tiānzhōngtiān ( "God of the Gods"), seemingly introduced by Yuezhi Buddhist missionaries to render the Sanskrit Devātideva (of the same meaning) or Bhagavān from their Iranian sources.

Both Buddhism and Taoism developed hierarchic pantheons which merged metaphysical (celestial) and physical (terrestrial) being, blurring the edge between the human and the divine, which reinforced the religious belief that gods and devotees sustain one another.

City Gods cult

The principle of reciprocity between the human and the divine, which was strengthened during the Tang dynasty, led to changes in the pantheon that reflected changes in the society. The late Tang dynasty saw the spread of the cult of the City Gods in direct bond to the development of the cities as centres of commerce and the rise in influence of merchant classes. Commercial travel opened China to influences from foreign cultures.

The City God is a protector of the boundaries of a city and of its internal and economic affairs, such as trade and elections of politicians. In each city, the respective City God is embodied by one or more historical personages, native of the city itself, who distinguished themselves by extraordinary attainments. Scholar Valerie Hansen argues that the City God is not a homegrown cult, but has its prototype in the Indian Vaiśravaṇa as a guardian deity.

Suppressions of Buddhism and foreign religions

Ming dynasty
In the 16th century, the Jesuit China missions played a significant role in opening dialogue between China and the West. The Jesuits brought Western sciences, becoming advisers to the imperial court on astronomy, taught mathematics and mechanics, but also adapted Chinese religious ideas such as admiration for Confucius and ancestor veneration into the religious doctrine they taught in China.

Qing dynasty

The Manchu-led Qing dynasty (1636–1912) promoted the teachings of Confucius as the textual tradition superior to all others. The Qing made their laws more severely patriarchal than any previous dynasty, and Buddhism and Taoism were downgraded. Despite this, Tibetan Buddhism began in this period to have significant presence in China, with Tibetan influence in the west, and with the Mongols and Manchus in the north.

Later, many folk religious and institutional religious temples were destroyed during the Taiping Rebellion (1850–1871). It was organised by Christian movements which established a separate state in southeast China against the Qing dynasty. In the Christian-inspired Taiping Heavenly Kingdom, official policies pursued the elimination of Chinese religions to substitute them with forms of Christianity. In this effort, the libraries of the Buddhist monasteries were destroyed, almost completely in the Yangtze River Delta.

As a reaction, the Boxer Rebellion at the turn of the century (1899–1901) would have been inspired by indigenous Chinese movements against the influence of Christian missionaries—"devils" as they were called by the Boxers—and Western colonialism. At that time China was being gradually invaded by European and American powers, and since 1860 Christian missionaries had had the right to build or rent premises, and they appropriated many temples. Churches with their high steeples and foreigners' infrastructures, factories and mines were viewed as disrupting feng shui ("wind–water" cosmic balance) and caused "tremendous offense" to the Chinese. The Boxers' action was aimed at sabotaging or outrightly destroying these infrastructures.

Early 20th century

China entered the 20th century under the Manchu Qing dynasty, whose rulers favoured traditional Chinese religions, and participated in public religious ceremonies, with state pomp, as at the Temple of Heaven in Beijing, where prayers for the harvest were offered. Tibetan Buddhists recognised the Dalai Lama as their spiritual and temporal leader. Popular cults were regulated by imperial policies, promoting certain deities while suppressing others. During the anti-foreign and anti-Christian Boxer Uprising of 1900, thousands of Chinese Christians and foreign missionaries were killed, but in the aftermath of the retaliatory invasion, numbers of reform-minded Chinese turned to Christianity. Between 1898 and 1904 the imperial government issued a measure to "build schools with temple property" ( miàochǎn xīngxué).

After the 1911 Xinhai Revolution, with increasing urbanisation and Western influence, the issue for the new intellectual class was no longer the worship of heterodox gods as it was the case in imperial times, but the delegitimisation of religion itself, and especially folk religion, as an obstacle to modernisation. Leaders of the New Culture Movement (1916–1923) revolted against Confucianism debated whether religion was cosmopolitan spirituality or irrational superstition, and the Anti-Christian Movement of 1923 was part of a rejection of Christianity as an instrument of foreign imperialism. Despite all this, the interest of Chinese reformers for spiritual and occult matters continued to thrive through the 1940s.

The Nationalist-governed Republic of China intensified the suppression of local religion. Temples were widely appropriated, destroyed, or used for schools. The 1928 "Standards for retaining or abolishing gods and shrines" formally abolished all cults of gods with the exception of human heroes such as Yu the Great, Guan Yu and Confucius. Sun Yat-sen, the first president of the Republic of China, and his successor Chiang Kai-shek, were both Christians. During the Japanese invasion of China between 1937 and 1945 many temples were used as barracks by soldiers and destroyed in warfare.

People's Republic of China

The People's Republic of China, proclaimed in 1949 under the leadership of Mao Zedong, established a policy of state atheism. Initially, the new government did not suppress religious practice, but, like its dynastic ancestors, viewed popular religious movements, especially in the countryside, as possibly seditious. The government condemned religious organisations, labeling them as superstitious. Religions that were deemed "appropriate" and given freedom were those that entailed the ancestral tradition of consolidated state rule. In addition, Marxism viewed religion as feudal. The Three-Self Patriotic Movement institutionalised Protestant churches in official organisations that renounced foreign funding and foreign control as imperialist. Chinese Catholics resisted the new government's move towards state control and independence from the Vatican. Later onwards, the Cultural Revolution (1966–1976) involved a systematic effort to destroy religion and New Confucianism. The historian Arthur Waldron explains that "communism was, in effect, a religion for its early Chinese converts: more than a sociological analysis, it was a revelation and a prophecy that engaged their entire beings and was expounded in sacred texts, many imported from Moscow and often printed in English".

The radical policy relaxed considerably in the late 1970s. Since 1978, the Constitution of the People's Republic of China guarantees "freedom of religion". Its article 36 states:

For several decades, the party acquiesced or even encouraged a religious revival. Most Chinese were allowed to worship as they felt best. Although "heterodox teachings" such as the Falun Gong were banned and practitioners have been persecuted since 1999, local authorities were likely to follow a hands-off policy towards other religions. In the late 20th century there was a reactivation of the state cults devoted to the Yellow Emperor and the Red Emperor. In the early 2000s, the Chinese government became open especially to traditional religions such as Mahayana Buddhism, Taoism and folk religion, emphasising the role of religion in building a "Harmonious Society" (hexie shehui), a Confucian idea. The government founded the Confucius Institute in 2004 to promote Chinese culture. China hosted religious meetings and conferences including the first World Buddhist Forum in 2006 and the subsequent World Buddhist Forums, a number of international Taoist meetings and local conferences on folk religions. Aligning with Chinese anthropologists' emphasis on "religious culture", the government considers these religions as integral expressions of national "Chinese culture".

A turning point was reached in 2005, when folk religious cults began to be protected and promoted under the policies of intangible cultural heritage. Not only were traditions that had been interrupted for decades resumed, but ceremonies forgotten for centuries were reinvented. The annual worship of the god Cáncóng of the ancient state of Shu, for instance, was resumed at a ceremonial complex near the Sanxingdui archaeological site in Sichuan. Modern Chinese political leaders have been deified into the common Chinese pantheon. The international community, including the United Nations, has become concerned about evidence that China has harvested the organs of Falun Gong practitioners and other religious minorities, including Christians and Uyghur Muslims. In 2019, a panel of lawyers concluded that organ harvesting was happening for Falun Gong followers and asked for further investigation to determine if the situation was a genocide.

In 2012, Xi Jinping was elected as the General Secretary of the Chinese Communist Party. During his early political career in the 1980s, Xi was the secretary of Zhengding County in Hebei, where he allied himself with Chan master Youming and helped the reconstruction of the county's Buddhist temples, explicitly expressing interest towards Buddhism. Once he became president of China, fighting moral void and corruption through a return to traditional culture became the primary tasks of the new government. The government's project also involved restricting Christian churches, which resulted in some removals of crosses from steeples and churches' demolition. At least one prominent pastor who protested was arrested on charges of misusing church funds. A lawyer who had counselled these churches appeared on state television to confess that he had been in collusion with American organisations to incite local Christians.

André Laliberté noted that despite there having been much talk about "persecution against religion (especially Christianity) in China", one should not jump to hasty conclusions, since "a large proportion of the population worship, pray, perform rituals and hold certain beliefs with the full support of the Party. Most of this activity affects people who subscribe to world views that are sometimes formally acknowledged by the state and are institutionalised, or others that are tacitly approved as customs". In this context, Christianity not only represents a small proportion of the population, but its adherents are still seen by the majority who observe traditional rituals as followers of a foreign religion that sets them apart from the body of society.

In September 2018, the Associated Press reported that "Xi is waging the most severe systematic suppression of Christianity in the country since religious freedom was written into the Chinese constitution in 1982", which has involved "destroying crosses, burning bibles, shutting churches and ordering followers to sign papers renouncing their faith". These abuses continued with a crackdown on all non-state religious groups and tighter control of state ones as Xi Jinping Thought was implemented. In addition to Christianity Islam has suffered from increasing repression with Muslim scholars and writers targeted by the state. Religious communities in China have been increasingly isolated from their coreligionists abroad.

Demographics

Demoscopic analyses and general results

Counting the number of religious people anywhere is hard; counting them in China is even harder. Low response rates, non-random samples, and adverse political and cultural climates are persistent problems. One scholar concludes that statistics on religious believers in China "cannot be accurate in a real scientific sense", since definitions of "religion" exclude people who do not see themselves as members of a religious organisation but are still "religious" in their daily actions and fundamental beliefs. The forms of Chinese religious expression tend to be syncretic and following one religion does not necessarily mean the rejection or denial of others. In surveys, few people identify as "Taoists" because to most Chinese this term refers to ordained priests of the religion. Traditionally, the Chinese language has not included a term for a lay follower of Taoism, since the concept of being "Taoist" in this sense is a new word that derives from the Western concept of "religion" as membership in a church institution.

Analysing Chinese traditional religions is further complicated by discrepancies between the terminologies used in Chinese and Western languages. While in the English current usage "folk religion" means broadly all forms of common cults of gods and ancestors, in Chinese usage and in academia these cults have not had an overarching name. By "folk religion" ( mínjiān zōngjiào) or "folk beliefs" ( mínjiān xìnyǎng) Chinese scholars have usually meant folk religious organisations and salvationist movements (folk religious sects). Furthermore, in the 1990s some of these organisations began to register as branches of the official Taoist Association and therefore to fall under the label of "Taoism". In order to address this terminological confusion, some Chinese intellectuals have proposed the legal recognition and management of the indigenous religion by the state and to adopt the label "Chinese native (or indigenous) religion" ( mínsú zōngjiào) or "Chinese ethnic religion" ( mínzú zōngjiào), or other names.

There has been much speculation by some Western authors about the number of Christians in China. Chris White, in a 2017 work for the Max Planck Institute for the Study of Religious and Ethnic Diversity of the Max Planck Society, criticises the data and narratives put forward by these authors. He notices that these authors work in the wake of a "Western evangelical bias" reflected in the coverage carried forward by popular media, especially in the United States, which rely upon a "considerable romanticisation" of Chinese Christians. Their data are mostly ungrounded or manipulated through undue interpretations, as "survey results do not support the authors' assertions".

 According to the results of an official census provided in 1995 by the Information Office of the State Council of China, at that time the Chinese traditional religions were already popular among nearly 1 billion people.
 2005: a survey of the religiosity of urban Chinese from the five cities of Beijing, Shanghai, Nantong, Wuhan and Baoding, conducted by professor Xinzhong Yao, found that only 5.3% of the analysed population belonged to religious organisations, while 51.8% were non-religious, in that they did not belong to any religious association. Nevertheless, 23.8% of the population regularly worshipped gods and venerated ancestors, 23.1% worshipped Buddha or identified themselves as Buddhists, up to 38.5% had beliefs and practices associated with the folk religions such as feng shui or belief in celestial powers, and only 32.9% were convinced atheists.
 Three surveys conducted respectively in 2005, 2006 and 2007 by the Horizon Research Consultancy Group on a disproportionately urban and suburban sample, found that Buddhists constituted between 11% and 16% of the total population, Christians were between 2% and 4%, and Muslims approximately 1%. The surveys also found that ~60% of the population believed in concepts such as fate and fortune associated to the folk religion.
 2007: a survey conducted by the East China Normal University taking into account people from different regions of China, concluded that there were approximately 300 million religious believers (≈31% of the total population), of whom the vast majority ascribable to Buddhism, Taoism and folk religions. 
 2008: a survey conducted in that year by Yu Tao of the University of Oxford with a survey scheme led and supervised by the Center for Chinese Agricultural Policy and the Peking University, analysing the rural populations of the six provinces of Jiangsu, Sichuan, Shaanxi, Jilin, Hebei and Fujian, each representing different geographic and economic regions of China, found that followers of the Chinese folk religions were 31.9% of the analysed population, Buddhists were 10.85%, Christians were 3.93% of whom 3.54% Protestants and 0.39% Catholics, and Taoists were 0.71%. The remaining 53.41% of the population claimed to be not religious.
 2010: the Chinese Spiritual Life Survey directed by the Purdue University's Center on Religion and Chinese Society concluded that many types of Chinese folk religions and Taoism are practised by possibly hundreds of millions of people; 56.2% of the total population or 754 million people practised Chinese ancestral religion, but only 16% claiming to "believe in the existence" of the ancestor; 12.9% or 173 million practised Taoism on a level indistinguishable from the folk religion; 0.9% or 12 million people identified exclusively as Taoists; 13.8% or 185 million identified as Buddhists, of whom 1.3% or 17.3 million had received formal initiation; 2.4% or 33 million identified as Christians, of whom 2.2% or 30 million as Protestants (of whom only 38% baptised in the official churches) and 0.02% or 3 million as Catholics; and an additional 1.7% or 23 million were Muslims.
 2012: the China Family Panel Studies (CFPS) conducted a survey of 25 of the provinces of China. The provinces surveyed had a Han majority, and did not include the autonomous regions of Inner Mongolia, Ningxia, Tibet and Xinjiang, and of Hong Kong and Macau. The survey found only ~10% of the population belonging to organised religions; specifically, 6.75% were Buddhists, 2.4% were Christians (of whom 1.89% Protestants and 0.41% Catholics), 0.54% were Taoists, 0.46% were Muslims, and 0.40% declared to belong to other religions. Although ~90% of the population declared that they did not belong to any religion, the survey estimated (according to a 1992 figure) that only 6.3% were atheists while the remaining 81% (≈1 billion people) prayed to or worshipped gods and ancestors in the manner of the folk religion.
 Four surveys conducted respectively in the years 2006, 2008, 2010 and 2011 as part of the Chinese General Social Survey (CGSS) of the Renmin University of China found an average 6.2% of the Chinese identifying as Buddhists, 2.3% as Christians (of whom 2% Protestants and 0.3% Catholics), 2.2% as members of folk religious sects, 1.7% as Muslims, and 0.2% as Taoists.
 2012-2014: analyses published in a study by Fenggang Yang and Anning Hu found that 55.5% of the adult population (15+) of China, or 578 million people in absolute numbers, believed and practised folk religions, including a 20% who practised ancestor veneration or communal worship of deities, and the rest who practised what Yang and Hu define "individual" folk religions like devotion to specific gods such as Caishen. Members of folk religious sects were not taken into account. Around the same year, Kenneth Dean estimated 680 million people involved in folk religion, or 51% of the total population. In the same years, reports of the Chinese government claim that the folk religious sects have about the same number of followers of the five state-sanctioned religions counted together (~13% ≈180 million).
 The CFPS 2014 survey, published in early 2017, found that 15.87% of the Chinese declare to be Buddhists, 5.94% to belong to unspecified other religions, 0.85% to be Taoists, 0.81% to be members of the popular sects, 2.53% to be Christians (2.19% Protestants and 0.34% Catholics) and 0.45% to be Muslims. 73.56% of the population does not belong to the state-sanctioned religions. CFPS 2014 asked the Chinese about belief in a certain conception of divinity rather than membership in a religious group in order to increase its survey accuracy.

Besides the surveys based on fieldwork, estimates using projections have been published by the Pew Research Center as part of its study of the Global Religious Landscape in 2010. This study estimated 21.9% of the population of China believed in folk religions, 18.2% were Buddhists, 5.1% were Christians, 1.8% were Muslims, 0.8% believed in other religions, while unaffiliated people constituted 52.2% of the population. According to the surveys by Phil Zuckerman published on Adherents.com, 59% of the Chinese population was not religious in 1993, and in 2005 between 8% and 14% was atheist (from over 100 to 180 million). A survey held in 2012 by WIN/GIA found that in China the atheists comprise 47% of the population.

Yu Tao's survey of the year 2008 provided a detailed analysis of the social characteristics of the religious communities. It found that the proportion of male believers was higher than the average among folk religious people, Taoists, and Catholics, while it was lower than the average among Protestants. The Buddhist community shew a greater balance of male and female believers. Concerning the age of believers, folk religious people and Catholics tended to be younger than the average, while Protestant and Taoist communities were composed by older people. The Christian community was more likely than other religions to have members belonging to the ethnic minorities. The study analysed the proportion of believers that were at the same time members of the local section of the CCP, finding that it was exceptionally high among the Taoists, while the lowest proportion was found among the Protestants. About education and wealth, the survey found that the wealthiest populations were those of Buddhists and especially Catholics, while the poorest was that of the Protestants; Taoists and Catholics were the better educated, while the Protestants were the less educated among the religious communities. These findings confirmed a description by Francis Ching-Wah Yip that the Protestant population was predominantly composed of rural people, illiterate and semi-illiterate people, elderly people, and women, already in the 1990s and early 2000s. A 2017 study of the Christian communities of Wuhan found the same socio-economic characteristics, with the addition that Christians were more likely to suffer from physical and mental illness than the general population.

The China Family Panel Studies' findings for 2012 shew that Buddhists tended to be younger and better educated, while Christians were older and more likely to be illiterate. Furthermore, Buddhists were generally wealthy, while Christians most often belonged to the poorest parts of the population. Henan was found hosting the largest percentage of Christians of any province of China, about 6%. According to Ji Zhe, Chan Buddhism and individual, non-institutional forms of folk religiosity are particularly successful among the contemporary Chinese youth.

Geographic distribution

The varieties of Chinese religion are spread across the map of China in different degrees. Southern provinces have experienced the most evident revival of Chinese folk religion, although it is present all over China in a great variety of forms, intertwined with Taoism, fashi orders, Confucianism, Nuo rituals, shamanism and other religious currents. Quanzhen Taoism is mostly present in the north, while Sichuan is the area where Tianshi Taoism developed and the early Celestial Masters had their main seat. Along the southeastern coast, Taoism reportedly dominates the ritual activity of popular religion, both in registered and unregistered forms (Zhengyi Taoism and unrecognized fashi orders). Since the 1990s, Taoism has been well-developed in the area.

Many scholars see "north Chinese religion" as distinct from practices in the south. The folk religion of southern and southeastern provinces is primarily focused on the lineages and their churches (zōngzú xiéhuì ) and the worship of ancestor-gods. The folk religion of central-northern China (North China Plain), otherwise, is focused on the communal worship of tutelary deities of creation and nature as identity symbols, by villages populated by families of different surnames, structured into "communities of the god(s)" (shénshè , or huì , "association"), which organise temple ceremonies (miaohui ), involving processions and pilgrimages, and led by indigenous ritual masters (fashi) who are often hereditary and linked to secular authority. Northern and southern folk religions also have a different pantheon, of which the northern one is composed of more ancient gods of Chinese mythology.

Folk religious movements of salvation have historically been more successful in the central plains and in the northeastern provinces than in southern China, and central-northern popular religion shares characteristics of some of the sects, such as the great importance given to mother goddess worship and shamanism, as well as their scriptural transmission. Also Confucian churches and jiaohua organizations have historically found much resonance among the population of the northeast; in the 1930s the Universal Church of the Way and its Virtue alone aggregated at least 25% of the population of the state of Manchuria and contemporary Shandong has been analysed as an area of rapid growth of folk Confucian groups.

Goossaert talks of this distinction, although recognizing it as an oversimplification, between a "Taoist south" and a "village-religion/Confucian centre-north", with the northern context also characterized by important orders of "folk Taoist" ritual masters, one order being that of the yinyangsheng (阴阳生 yīnyángshēng), and sectarian traditions, and also by a low influence of Buddhism and official Taoism.

The folk religion of northeast China (Manchuria) has unique characteristics deriving from the interaction of Han religion with Tungus and Manchu shamanisms; these include the practice of chūmǎxiān ( "riding for the immortals"), the worship of Fox Gods and other zoomorphic deities, and of the Great Lord of the Three Foxes ( Húsān Tàiyé) and the Great Lady of the Three Foxes ( Húsān Tàinǎi) usually positioned at the head of pantheons. Otherwise, in the religious context of Inner Mongolia there has been a significant integration of Han Chinese into the traditional folk religion of the region.

Across China, Han religion has even adopted deities from Tibetan folk religion, especially wealth gods. In Tibet, across broader western China, and in Inner Mongolia, there has been a growth of the cult of Gesar with the explicit support of the Chinese government, Gesar being a cross-ethnic Han-Tibetan, Mongol and Manchu deity—the Han identify him as an aspect of the god of war analogically with Guandi—and culture hero whose mythology is embodied in a culturally important epic poem.

The Han Chinese schools of Buddhism are mostly practiced in the eastern part of the country. On the other hand, Tibetan Buddhism is the dominant religion in Tibet, and significantly present in other westernmost provinces where ethnic Tibetans constitute a significant part of the population, and has a strong influence in Inner Mongolia in the north. The Tibetan tradition has also been gaining a growing influence among the Han Chinese.

Christians are especially concentrated in the three provinces of Henan, Anhui and Zhejiang. The latter two provinces were in the area affected by the Taiping Rebellion, and Zhejiang along with Henan were hubs of the intense Protestant missionary activity in the 19th and early 20th century. Christianity has been practiced in Hong Kong since 1841. As of 2010 there are 843,000 Christians in Hong Kong (11.8% of the total population). As of 2010 approximately 5% of the population of Macau self-identifies as Christian, predominantly Catholic.

Islam is the majority religion in areas inhabited by the Hui Muslims, particularly the province of Ningxia, and in the province of Xinjiang that is inhabited by the Uyghurs. Many ethnic minority groups in China follow their own traditional ethnic religions: Benzhuism of the Bai, Bimoism of the Yi, Bön of the Tibetans, Dongbaism of the Nakhi, Miao folk religion, Qiang folk religion, Yao folk religion, Zhuang folk religion, Mongolian shamanism or Tengerism, and Manchu shamanism among Manchus.

Religions by province
Historical record and contemporary scholarly fieldwork testify certain central and northern provinces of China as hotbeds of folk religious sects and Confucian religious groups. 
 Hebei: Fieldwork by Thomas David Dubois testifies the dominance of folk religious movements, specifically the Church of the Heaven and the Earth and the Church of the Highest Supreme, since their "energetic revival since the 1970s" (p. 13), in the religious life of the counties of Hebei. Religious life in rural Hebei is also characterized by a type of organization called the benevolent churches and the salvationist movement known as Zailiism has returned active since the 1990s.
 Henan: According to Heberer and Jakobi (2000) Henan has been for centuries a hub of folk religious sects (p. 7) that constitute significant focuses of the religious life of the province. Sects present in the region include the Baguadao or Tianli ("Order of Heaven") sect, the Dadaohui, the Tianxianmiaodao, the Yiguandao, and many others. Henan also has a strong popular Confucian orientation (p. 5).
 Northeast China: According to official records by the then-government, the Universal Church of the Way and its Virtue or Morality Society had 8 million members in Manchuria, or northeast China in the 1930s, making up about 25% of the total population of the area (note that the state of Manchuria also included the eastern end of modern-day Inner Mongolia). Folk religious movements of a Confucian nature, or Confucian churches, were in fact very successful in the northeast.
 Shandong: The province is traditionally a stronghold of Confucianism and is the area of origin of many folk religious sects and Confucian churches of the modern period, including the Universal Church of the Way and its Virtue, the Way of the Return to the One ( Guīyīdào), the Way of Unity ( Yīguàndào), and others. Alex Payette (2016) testifies the rapid growth of Confucian groups in the province in the 2010s.

According to the Chinese General Social Survey of 2012, about 2.2% of the total population of China (around 30 million people) claims membership in the folk religious sects, which have likely maintained their historical dominance in central-northern and northeastern China.

Definition of what in China is spiritual and religious

Centring and ancestrality

Han Chinese culture embodies a concept of religion that differs from the one that is common in the Abrahamic traditions, which are based on the belief in an omnipotent God who exists outside the world and human race and has complete power over them. Chinese religions, in general, do not place as much emphasis as Christianity does on exclusivity and doctrine.

Han Chinese culture is marked by a "harmonious holism" in which religious expression is syncretic and religious systems encompass elements that grow, change, and transform but remain within an organic whole. The performance of rites ( lǐ) is the key characteristic of common Chinese religion, which scholars see as going back to Neolithic times. According to the scholar Stephan Feuchtwang, rites are conceived as "what makes the invisible visible", making possible for humans to cultivate the underlying order of nature. Correctly performed rituals move society in alignment with earthly and heavenly (astral) forces, establishing the harmony of the three realms—Heaven, Earth and humanity. This practice is defined as "centring" ( yāng or  zhōng). Rituals may be performed by government officials, family elders, popular ritual masters and Taoists, the latter cultivating local gods to centre the forces of the universe upon a particular locality. Among all things of creation, humans themselves are "central" because they have the ability to cultivate and centre natural forces.

This primordial sense of ritual united the moral and the religious and drew no boundaries between family, social, and political life. From earliest times, the Chinese tended to be all-embracing rather than to treat different religious traditions as separate and independent. The scholar Xinzhong Yao argues that the term "Chinese religion", therefore, does not imply that there is only one religious system, but that the "different ways of believing and practicing... are rooted in and can be defined by culturally common themes and features", and that "different religious streams and strands have formed a culturally unitary single tradition" in which basic concepts and practices are related.

The continuity of Chinese civilisation across thousands of years and thousands of square miles is made possible through China's religious traditions understood as systems of knowledge transmission. A worthy Chinese is expected to remember a vast amount of information from the past, and to draw on this past to form his moral reasoning. The remembrance of the past and of ancestors is important for individuals and groups. The identities of descent-based groups are molded by stories, written genealogies (zupu, "books of ancestors"), temple activities, and village theatre which link them to history.

This reliance on group memory is the foundation of the Chinese practice of ancestor worship ( bàizǔ or  jìngzǔ) which dates back to prehistory, and is the focal aspect of Chinese religion. Defined as "the essential religion of the Chinese", ancestor worship is the means of memory and therefore of the cultural vitality of the entire Chinese civilisation. Rites, symbols, objects and ideas construct and transmit group and individual identities. Rituals and sacrifices are employed not only to seek blessing from the ancestors, but also to create a communal and educational religious environment in which people are firmly linked with a glorified history. Ancestors are evoked as gods and kept alive in these ceremonies to bring good luck and protect from evil forces and ghosts.

The two major festivals involving ancestor worship are the Qingming Festival and the Double Ninth Festival, but veneration of ancestors is held in many other ceremonies, including weddings, funerals, and triad initiations. Worshippers generally offer prayers through a jingxiang rite, with offerings of food, light incense and candles, and burning joss paper. These activities are typically conducted at the site of ancestral graves or tombs, at an ancestral temple, or at a household shrine.

A practice developed in the Chinese folk religion of post-Maoist China, that started in the 1990s from the Confucian temples managed by the Kong kin (the lineage of the descendants of Confucius himself), is the representation of ancestors in ancestral shrines no longer just through tablets with their names, but through statues. Statuary effigies were previously exclusively used for Buddhist bodhisattva and Taoist gods.

Lineage cults of the founders of surnames and kins are religious microcosms which are part of a larger organism, that is the cults of the ancestor-gods of regional and ethnic groups, which in turn are part of a further macrocosm, the cults of virtuous historical figures that have had an important impact in the history of China, notable examples including Confucius, Guandi, or Huangdi, Yandi and Chiyou, the latter three considered ancestor-gods of the Han Chinese (Huangdi and Yandi) and of western minority ethnicities and foreigners (Chiyou). This hierarchy proceeds up to the gods of the cosmos, the Earth and Heaven itself. In other words, ancestors are regarded as the equivalent of Heaven within human society, and are therefore the means connecting back to Heaven as the "utmost ancestral father" ( zēngzǔfù).

Theological and cosmological discourse 

Tian  ("Heaven" or "Sky") is the idea of absolute principle or God manifesting as the northern culmen and starry vault of the skies in Chinese common religion and philosophy. Various interpretations have been elaborated by Confucians, Taoists, and other schools of thought. A popular representation of Heaven is the Jade Deity ( Yùdì) or Jade Emperor ( Yùhuáng). Tian is defined in many ways, with many names, other well-known ones being Tàidì  (the "Great Deity") and Shàngdì  (the "Highest Deity") or simply Dì  ("Deity").
 Huáng Tiān  —"Yellow Heaven" or "Shining Heaven", when it is venerated as the lord of creation;
 Hào Tiān —"Vast Heaven", with regard to the vastness of its vital breath (qi);
 Mín Tiān —"Compassionate Heaven", for it hears and corresponds with justice to the all-under-Heaven;
 Shàng Tiān —"Highest Heaven" or "First Heaven", for it is the primordial being supervising all-under-Heaven;
 Cāng Tiān —"Deep-Green Heaven", for it being unfathomably deep.

Di  is rendered as "deity" or "emperor" and describes a divine principle that exerts a fatherly dominance over what it produces. Tengri is the equivalent of Tian in Altaic shamanic religions. By the words of Stephan Feuchtwang, in Chinese cosmology "the universe creates itself out of a primary chaos of material energy" (hundun  and qi), organising as the polarity of yin and yang which characterises any thing and life. Creation is therefore a continuous ordering; it is not a creation ex nihilo. Yin and yang are the invisible and the visible, the receptive and the active, the unshaped and the shaped; they characterise the yearly cycle (winter and summer), the landscape (shady and bright), the sexes (female and male), and even sociopolitical history (disorder and order).

While Confucian theology emphasises the need to realise the starry order of the Heaven in human society, Taoist theology emphasises the Tao  ("Way"), which in one word denotes both the source and its spontaneous arising in nature. In the Confucian text "On Rectification" (Zheng lun) of the Xunzi, the God of Heaven is discussed as an active power setting in motion creation. In the tradition of New Text Confucianism, Confucius is regarded as a "throne-less king" of the God of Heaven and a savior of the world. Otherwise, the school of the Old Texts regards Confucius as a sage who gave a new interpretation to the tradition from previous great dynasties. Neo-Confucian thinkers such as Zhu Xi (1130–1200) developed the idea of Lǐ , the "reason", "order" of Heaven, which unfolds in the polarity of yin and yang. In Taoist theology, the God of Heaven is discussed as the Jade Purity ( Yùqīng), the "Heavenly Honourable of the First Beginning" ( Yuánshǐ Tiānzūn), the central of the Three Pure Ones—who represent the centre of the universe and its two modalities of manifestation. Even Chinese Buddhism adapted to common Chinese cosmology by paralleling its concept of a triune supreme with Shakyamuni, Amithaba and Maitreya representing respectively enlightenment, salvation and post-apocalyptic paradise, while the Tathātā ( zhēnrú, "suchness") is generally identified as the supreme being itself.

In Chinese religion, Tian is both transcendent and immanent, inherent in the multiple phenomena of nature (polytheism or cosmotheism, yǔzhòu shénlùn ). The shén , as explained in the Shuowen Jiezi, "are the spirits of Heaven. They draw out the ten thousand things". Shen and ancestors ( zǔ) are agents who generate phenomena which reveal or reproduce the order of Heaven. Shen, as defined by the scholar Stephen Teiser, is a term that needs to be translated into English in at least three different ways, according to the context: "spirit", "spirits", and "spiritual". The first, "spirit", is in the sense of "human spirit" or "psyche". The second use is "spirits" or "gods"—the latter written in lowercase because "Chinese spirits and gods need not be seen as all-powerful, transcendent, or creators of the world". These "spirits" are associated with stars, mountains, and streams and directly influence what happens in the natural and human world. A thing or being is "spiritual"—the third sense of shen—when it inspires awe or wonder.

Shen are opposed in several ways to guǐ  ("ghosts", or "demons"). Shen are considered yáng , while gui are yīn . Gui may be the spirit or soul of an ancestor called back to live in the family's spirit tablet. Yet the combination  guǐshén ("ghosts and spirits") includes both good and bad, those that are lucky or unlucky, benevolent or malevolent, the heavenly and the demonic aspect of living beings. This duality of guishen  animates all beings, whether rocks, trees, and planets, or animals and human beings. In this sense, "animism" may be said to characterise the Chinese worldview. Further, since humans, shen, and gui are all made of  qì (pneuma or primordial stuff), there is no gap or barrier between good and bad spirits or between these spirits and human beings. There is no ontological difference between gods and demons, and humans may emulate the gods and join them in the pantheon. If these spirits are neglected or abandoned, or were not treated with death rituals if they were humans, they become hungry and are trapped in places where they met their death, becoming dangerous for living beings and requiring exorcism.

Concepts of religion, tradition, and doctrine

There was no term that corresponded to "religion" in Classical Chinese. The combination of zong and jiao, which now corresponds to "religion", was in circulation since the Tang dynasty in Chan circles to define the Buddhist doctrine. It was chosen to translate the Western concept "religion" only at the end of the 19th century, when Chinese intellectuals adopted the Japanese term shūkyō (pronounced zongjiao in Chinese). Under the influence of Western rationalism and later Marxism, what most of the Chinese today mean as zōngjiào are "organised doctrines", that is "superstructures consisting of superstitions, dogmas, rituals and institutions". Most academics in China use the term "religion" (zongjiao) to include formal institutions, specific beliefs, a clergy, and sacred texts, while Western scholars tend to use the term more loosely.

Zōng ( "ancestor", "model", "mode", "master", "pattern", but also "purpose") implies that the understanding of the ultimate derives from the transformed figure of great ancestors or progenitors, who continue to support—and correspondingly rely on—their descendants, in a mutual exchange of benefit. Jiào ( "teaching") is connected to filial piety (xiao), as it implies the transmission of knowledge from the elders to the youth and of support from the youth to the elders.

Understanding religion primarily as an ancestral tradition, the Chinese have a relationship with the divine that functions socially, politically as well as spiritually. The Chinese concept of "religion" draws the divine near to the human world. Because "religion" refers to the bond between the human and the divine, there is always a danger that this bond be broken. However, the term zōngjiào—instead of separation—emphasises communication, correspondence and mutuality between the ancestor and the descendant, the master and the disciple, and between the Way (Tao, the way of the divine in nature) and its ways. Ancestors are the mediators of Heaven. In other words, to the Chinese, the supreme principle is manifested and embodied by the chief gods of each phenomenon and of each human kin, making the worship of the highest God possible even in each ancestral temple.

Chinese concepts of religion differ from concepts in Judaism and Christianity, says scholar Julia Ching, which were "religions of the fathers", that is, patriarchal religions, whereas Chinese religion was not only "a patriarchal religion but also an ancestral religion". Israel believed in the "God of its fathers, but not its divinised fathers". Among the ancient Chinese, the God of the Zhou dynasty appeared to have been an ancestor of the ruling house. "The belief in Tian (Heaven) as the great ancestral spirit differed from the Judeo-Christian, and later Islamic belief in a creator God". Early Christianity's Church Fathers pointed out that the First Commandment injunction, "thou shalt have no other gods before me", reserved all worship for one God, and that prayers therefore might not be offered to the dead, even though Judaism, Christianity, and Islam did encourage prayers for the dead. Unlike the Abrahamic traditions in which living beings are created by God out of nothing, in Chinese religions all living beings descend from beings that existed before. These ancestors are the roots of current and future beings. They continue to live in the lineage which they begot, and are cultivated as models and exemplars by their descendants.

The mutual support of elders and youth is needed for the continuity of the ancestral tradition, that is communicated from generation to generation. With an understanding of religion as teaching and education, the Chinese have a staunch confidence in the human capacity of transformation and perfection, enlightenment or immortality. In the Chinese religions, humans are confirmed and reconfirmed with the ability to improve themselves, in a positive attitude towards eternity. Hans Küng defined Chinese religions as the "religions of wisdom", thereby distinguishing them from the "religions of prophecy" (Judaism, Christianity and Islam) and from the "religions of mysticism" (Hinduism, Jainism and Buddhism).

The cults of gods and ancestors that in recent (originally Western) literature have been classified as "Chinese popular religion", traditionally neither have a common name nor are considered zōngjiào ("doctrines"). The lack of an overarching name conceptualising Chinese local and indigenous cults has led to some confusion in the terminology employed in scholarly literature. In Chinese, with the terms usually translated in English as "folk religion" (i.e.  mínjiān zōngjiào) or "folk faith" (i.e.  mínjiān xìnyǎng) they generally refer to the folk religious movements of salvation, and not to the local and indigenous cults of gods and ancestors. To resolve this issue, some Chinese intellectuals have proposed to formally adopt "Chinese native religion" or "Chinese indigenous religion" (i.e.  mínsú zōngjiào), or "Chinese ethnic religion" (i.e.  mínzú zōngjiào), or even "Chinese religion" ( Zhōnghuájiào) and "Shenxianism" ( Shénxiānjiào), as single names for the local indigenous cults of China.

Religious economy of temples and rituals 

The economic dimension of Chinese folk religion is also important. Mayfair Yang (2007) studied how rituals and temples interweave to form networks of grassroots socio-economic capital for the welfare of local communities, fostering the circulation of wealth and its investment in the "sacred capital" of temples, gods and ancestors.

This religious economy already played a role in periods of imperial China, plays a significant role in modern Taiwan, and is seen as a driving force in the rapid economic development in parts of rural China, especially the southern and eastern coasts.

According to Law (2005), in his study about the relationship between the revival of folk religion and the reconstruction of patriarchal civilisation:
 "Similar to the case in Taiwan, the practice of folk religion in rural southern China, particularly in the Pearl River Delta, has thrived as the economy has developed. ... In contrast to Weberian predictions, these phenomena suggest that drastic economic development in the Pearl River Delta may not lead to total disenchantment with beliefs concerning magic in the cosmos. On the contrary, the revival of folk religions in the Delta region is serving as a countervailing re-embedding force from the local cultural context, leading to the coexistence of the world of enchantments and the modern world."

Yang defined it as an "embedded capitalism", which preserves local identity and autonomy, and an "ethical capitalism" in which the drive for individual accumulation of money is tempered by religious and kinship ethics of generosity that foster the sharing and investment of wealth in the construction of civil society. Hao (2017) defined lineage temples as nodes of economic and political power which work through the principle of crowdfunding (zhongchou):
 "A successful family temple economy expands its clientele from lineage relatives to strangers from other villages and kin groups by shifting from the worship of a single ancestor to embrace diverse religions. In this way, the management of a temple metamorphoses into a real business. Most Shishi villages have associations for the elderly (laorenhui), which are formed through a 'civil election' (minxuan) among prosperous businessmen representing their family committees. This association resembles the local government of a village, with responsibilities for popular rituals as well as public order."

Main religions

Chinese popular religion 

Chinese popular or folk religion, otherwise simply known as "Chinese religion", is the "background" religious tradition of the Chinese, whose practices and beliefs are shared by both the elites and the common people. This tradition includes veneration of forces of nature and ancestors, exorcism of harmful forces, and a belief that a rational order structures the universe, and such order may be influenced by human beings and their rulers. Worship is devoted to gods and immortals (shén and xiān), who may be founders of human groups and lineages, deities of stars, earthly phenomena, and of human behaviour.

Chinese popular religion is "diffused", rather than "institutional", in the sense that there are no canonical scriptures or unified clergy—though it relies upon the vast heritage represented by the Chinese classics—, and its practices and beliefs are handed down over the generations through Chinese mythology as told in popular forms of literature, theatre, and visual arts, and are embedded in rituals which define the microcosm of the nuclear families, the kins or lineages (which are peoples within the Chinese people, identified by the same surnames and by the same ancestor-god), and professional guilds, rather than in institutions with merely religious functions. It is a meaning system of social solidarity and identity, which provides the fabric of Chinese society, uniting all its levels from the lineages to the village or city communities, to the state and the national economy.

Because this common religion is embedded in Chinese social relations, it historically has never had an objectifying name. Since the 2000s, Chinese scholars have proposed names to identify it more clearly, including "Chinese native religion" or "Chinese indigenous religion" ( mínsú zōngjiào), "Chinese ethnic religion" ( mínzú zōngjiào), or simply "Chinese religion" ( Zhōnghuájiào), "Shenism" ( Shénjiào) and "Shenxianism" ( Shénxiānjiào, "religion of deities and immortals"). This search for a precise name is meant to solve terminological confusion, since "folk religion" ( mínjiān zōngjiào) or "folk belief" ( mínjiān xìnyǎng) have historically defined the sectarian movements of salvation and not the local cults devoted to deities and progenitors, and it is also meant to identify a "national Chinese religion" similarly to Hinduism in India and Shinto in Japan.

Taoism has been defined by scholar and Taoist initiate Kristofer Schipper as a doctrinal and liturgical framework for the development of indigenous religions. The Zhengyi school is especially intertwined with local cults, with Zhengyi daoshi ("masters of the Tao", otherwise commonly translated simply the "Taoists", since common followers and folk believers who are not part of Taoist orders are not identified as such) performing rituals for local temples and communities. Various vernacular orders of ritual ministers often identified as "folk Taoists", operate in folk religion but outside the jurisdiction of the state's Taoist Church or schools clearly identified as Taoist. Confucianism advocates the worship of gods and ancestors through appropriate rites. Folk temples and ancestral shrines, on special occasions, may use Confucian liturgy ( rú or  zhèngtǒng, "orthoprax") led by Confucian "sages of rites" ( lǐshēng), who in many cases are the elders of a local community. Confucian liturgies are alternated with Taoist liturgies and popular ritual styles. Taoism in its various currents, either comprehended or not within Chinese folk religion, has some of its origins from Chinese shamanism (Wuism).

Despite this great diversity, all experiences of Chinese religion have a common theological core that may be summarised in four cosmological and moral concepts: Tian, Heaven, the "transcendently immanent" source of moral meaning; qi, the breath or energy–matter that animates the universe; jingzu, the veneration of ancestors; and bao ying, moral reciprocity; together with two traditional concepts of fate and meaning: ming yun, the personal destiny or burgeoning; and yuan fen, "fateful coincidence", good and bad chances and potential relationships.

In Chinese religion yin and yang constitute the polarity that describes the order of the universe, held in balance by the interaction of principles of growth or expansion (shen) and principles of waning or contraction (gui), with act (yang) usually preferred over receptiveness (yin). Ling (numen or sacred) coincides with the middle way between the two states, that is the inchoate order of creation. It is the force establishing responsive communication between yin and yang, and is the power of gods, masters of building and healing, rites and sages.

The present-day government of China, like the erstwhile imperial dynasties of the Ming and Qing, tolerates popular religious cults if they bolster social stability, but suppresses or persecutes cults and deities which threaten moral order. After the fall of the empire in 1911, governments and elites opposed or attempted to eradicate folk religion in order to promote "modern" values while overcoming "feudal superstition". These attitudes began to change in the late 20th century, and contemporary scholars generally have a positive vision of popular religion.

Since the 1980s Chinese folk religions experienced a revival in both mainland China and Taiwan. Some forms have received official approval as they preserve traditional Chinese culture, including the worship of Mazu and the school of Sanyiism in Fujian, Huangdi worship, and other forms of local worship, for instance the worship of Longwang, Pangu or Caishen. In mid-2015 the government of Zhejiang began the registration of the province's tens of thousands of folk religious temples.

According to the most recent demographic analyses, an average 80% of the population of China, approximately 1 billion people, practises cults of gods and ancestors or belongs to folk religious movements. Moreover, according to one survey approximately 14% of the population claims different levels of affiliation with Taoist practices. Other figures from the micro-level testify the wide proliferation of folk religions: in 1989 there were 21,000 male and female shamans (shen han and wu po respectively, as they are named locally), 60% of them young, in the Pingguo County of Guangxi alone; and by the mid-1990s the government of the Yulin Prefecture of Shaanxi counted over 10,000 folk temples on its territory alone, for a population of 3.1 million, an average of one temple per 315 persons.

According to Wu and Lansdowne:
"... numbers for authorised religions are dwarfed by the huge comeback of traditional folk religion in China. ... these actually may involve the majority of the population. Chinese officials and scholars now are studying "folk faiths" ... after decades of suppressing any discussion of this phenomenon. Certain local officials for some time have had to treat regional folk faiths as de facto legitimate religion, alongside the five authorized religions."

According to Yiyi Lu, discussing the reconstruction of Chinese civil society:
 "... the two decades after the reforms have seen the revival of many folk societies organized around the worshipping of local deities, which had been banned by the state for decades as 'feudal superstition'. These societies enjoy wide local support, as they carry on traditions going back many generations, and cater to popular beliefs in theism, fatalism and retribution ... Because they build on tradition, common interest, and common values, these societies enjoy social legitimacy ... ."

In December 2015, the Chinese Folk Temples' Management Association was formally established with the approval of the government of China and under the aegis of the Ministry of Cultural Affairs.

Folk religious movements of salvation 

China has a long history of sectarian traditions, called "salvationist religions" ( jiùdù zōngjiào) by some scholars, which are characterised by a concern for salvation (moral fulfillment) of the person and the society, having a soteriological and eschatological character. They generally emerged from the common religion but are separate from the lineage cults of ancestors and progenitors, as well as from the communal worship of deities of village temples, neighbourhood, corporation, or national temples. The 20th-century expression of such religions has been studied under Prasenjit Duara's definition of "redemptive societies" ( jiùshì tuántǐ), while modern Chinese scholarship describes them as "folk religious sects" ( mínjiān zōngjiào,  mínjiān jiàomén or  mínjiān jiàopài), overcoming the ancient derogatory definition of xiéjiào, "evil religion".

These religions are characterised by egalitarianism, charismatic founding figures claiming to have received divine revelation, a millenarian eschatology and voluntary path of salvation, an embodied experience of the numinous through healing and cultivation, and an expansive orientation through good deeds, evangelism and philanthropy. Their practices are focused on improving morality, body cultivation, and on the recitation of scriptures.

Many redemptive religions of the 20th and 21st century aspire to embody and reform Chinese tradition in the face of Western modernism and materialism. They include Yiguandao and other sects belonging to the Xiantiandao ( "Way of Former Heaven"), Jiugongdao ( "Way of the Nine Palaces"), the various branches of Luoism, Zailiism, and more recent ones such as the Church of Virtue, Weixinism, Xuanyuanism and Tiandiism. Also the qigong schools are developments of folk salvationist movements. All these movements were banned in the early Republic of China (1912–49) and later People's Republic. Many of them still remain underground or unrecognised in China, while others—for instance the Church of Virtue, Tiandiism, Xuanyuanism, Weixinism and Yiguandao—operate in China and collaborate with academic and non-governmental organisations. Sanyiism is another folk religious organisation founded in the 16th century, which is present in the Putian region (Xinghua) of Fujian where it is legally recognised. Some of these movements began to register as branches of the Taoist Association since the 1990s.

Another category that has been sometimes confused with that of the folk salvationist movements by scholars is that of the secret societies ( huìdàomén,  mìmì shèhuì, or  mìmì jiéshè). They are religious communities of initiatory and secretive character, including rural militias such as the Red Spears and the Big Knives, and fraternal organisations such as the Green Gangs and the Elders' Societies. They were very active in the early republican period, and often identified as "heretical doctrines" ( zōngjiào yìduān). Recent scholarship has coined the category of "secret sects" ( mìmì jiàomén) to distinguish positively-viewed peasant secret societies of the Yuan, Ming and Qing dynasties, from the negatively-viewed secret societies of the early republic which were regarded as anti-revolutionary forces.

A further type of folk religious movements, possibly overlapping with the "secret sects", are the martial sects. They combine two aspects: the wénchǎng ( "cultural field"), which is a doctrinal aspect characterised by elaborate cosmologies, theologies, and liturgies, and usually taught only to initiates; and the wǔchǎng ( "martial field"), that is the practice of bodily cultivation, usually shown as the "public face" of the sect. These martial folk religions were outlawed by Ming imperial decrees which continued to be enforced until the fall of the Qing dynasty in the 20th century. An example of martial sect is Meihuaism ( Méihuājiào, "Plum Flowers"), a branch of Baguaism which has become very popular throughout northern China. In Taiwan, virtually all folk salvationist movements operate freely since the late 1980s.

Confucianism 

Confucianism in Chinese is called,  Rújiào, the "teaching of scholars", or  Kǒngjiào, the "teaching of Confucius". It is both a teaching and a set of ritual practices. Yong Chen calls the question on the definition of Confucianism "probably one of the most controversial issues in both Confucian scholarship and the discipline of religious studies".

Guy Alitto points out that there was "literally no equivalent for the Western (and later worldwide) concept of 'Confucianism' in traditional Chinese discourse". He argues that the Jesuit missionaries of the 16th century selected Confucius from many possible sages to serve as the counterpart to Christ or Muhammad in order to meet European religion categories. They used a variety of writings by Confucius and his followers to coin a new "-ism"—"Confucianism"—which they presented as a "rationalist secular-ethical code", not as a religion. This secular understanding of Confucianism inspired both the Enlightenment in Europe in the 18th century, and Chinese intellectuals of the 20th century. Liang Shuming, a philosopher of the May Fourth Movement, wrote that Confucianism "functioned as a religion without actually being one". Western scholarship generally accepted this understanding. In the decades following the Second World War, however, many Chinese intellectuals and academic scholars in the West, among whom Tu Weiming, reversed this assessment. Confucianism, for this new generation of scholars, became a "true religion" that offered "immanent transcendence".

According to Herbert Fingarette's conceptualisation of Confucianism as a religion which proposes "the secular as sacred", Confucianism transcends the dichotomy between religion and humanism. Confucians experience the sacred as existing in this world as part of everyday life, most importantly in family and social relations. Confucianism focuses on a thisworldly awareness of Tian ( "Heaven"), the search for a middle way in order to preserve social harmony and on respect through teaching and a set of ritual practices. Joël Thoraval finds that Confucianism expresses on a popular level in the widespread worship of five cosmological entities: Heaven and Earth (Di ), the sovereign or the government (jūn ), ancestors (qīn ) and masters (shī ). Confucians cultivate family bonds and social harmony rather than pursuing a transcendental salvation. The scholar Joseph Adler concludes that Confucianism is not so much a religion in the Western sense, but rather "a non-theistic, diffused religious tradition", and that Tian is not so much a personal God but rather "an impersonal absolute, like dao and Brahman".

Broadly speaking, however, scholars agree that Confucianism may be also defined as an ethico-political system, developed from the teachings of the philosopher Confucius (551–479 BCE). Confucianism originated during the Spring and Autumn period and developed metaphysical and cosmological elements in the Han dynasty (206 BCE–220 CE), to match the developments in Buddhism and Taoism which were dominant among the populace. By the same period, Confucianism became the core idea of Chinese imperial politics. According to He Guanghu, Confucianism may be identified as a continuation of the Shang-Zhou (~1600 BCE–256 BCE) official religion, or the Chinese aboriginal religion which has lasted uninterrupted for three thousand years.

By the words of Tu Weiming and other Confucian scholars who recover the work of Kang Youwei (a Confucian reformer of the early 20th century), Confucianism revolves around the pursuit of the unity of the individual self and Heaven, or, otherwise said, around the relationship between humanity and Heaven. The principle of Heaven (Li or Dao) is the order of the creation and the source of divine authority, monistic in its structure. Individuals may realise their humanity and become one with Heaven through the contemplation of this order. This transformation of the self may be extended to the family and society to create a harmonious fiduciary community. Confucianism conciliates both the inner and outer polarities of spiritual cultivation, that is to say self-cultivation and world redemption, synthesised in the ideal of "sageliness within and kingliness without". As defined by Stephan Feuchtwang, Heaven is thought to have an ordering law which preserves the world, which has to be followed by humanity by means of a "middle way" between yin and yang forces; social harmony or morality is identified as patriarchy, which is the worship of ancestors and progenitors in the male line, in ancestral shrines.

In Confucian thought, human beings are always teachable, improvable, and perfectible through personal and communal endeavor of self-cultivation and self-creation. Some of the basic Confucian ethical and practical concepts include rén, yì, lǐ, and zhì. Ren is translated as "humaneness", or the essence proper of a human being, which is characterised by compassionate mind; it is the virtue endowed by Heaven and at the same time what allows man to achieve oneness with Heaven—in the Datong shu it is defined as "to form one body with all things" and "when the self and others are not separated ... compassion is aroused". Yi is "righteousness", which consists in the ability to always maintain a moral disposition to do good things. Li is a system of ritual norms and propriety of behaviour which determine how a person should act in everyday life. Zhi is the ability to see what is right and what is wrong, in the behaviour exhibited by others. Confucianism holds one in contempt when he fails to uphold the cardinal moral values of ren and yi.

Confucianism never developed an institutional structure similar to that of Taoism, and its religious body never differentiated from Chinese folk religion. Since the 2000s, Confucianism has been embraced as a religious identity by a large numbers of intellectuals and students in China. In 2003, the Confucian intellectual Kang Xiaoguang published a manifesto in which he made four suggestions: Confucian education should enter official education at any level, from elementary to high school; the state should establish Confucianism as the state religion by law; Confucian religion should enter the daily life of ordinary people, a purpose achievable through a standardisation and development of doctrines, rituals, organisations, churches and activity sites; the Confucian religion should be spread through non-governmental organisations. Another modern proponent of the institutionalisation of Confucianism in a state church is Jiang Qing.

In 2005, the Center for the Study of Confucian Religion was established and guoxue ("national learning") started to be implemented in public schools. Being well received by the population, even Confucian preachers started to appear on television since 2006. The most enthusiast New Confucians proclaim the uniqueness and superiority of Confucian Chinese culture, and have generated some popular sentiment against Western cultural influences in China.

The idea of a "Confucian Church" as the state religion of China has roots in the thought of Kang Youwei (1858–1927), an exponent of the early New Confucian search for a regeneration of the social relevance of Confucianism at a time when it fell out of favour with the fall of the Qing dynasty and the end of the Chinese empire. Kang modeled his ideal "Confucian Church" after European national Christian churches, as a hierarchic and centralised institution, closely bound to the state, with local church branches devoted to the worship of Confucius and the spread of his teachings.

In contemporary China, the Confucian revival has developed into various interwoven directions: the proliferation of Confucian schools or academies (shuyuan  or  Kǒngxuétáng, "Confucian learning halls"), the resurgence of Confucian rites (chuántǒng lǐyí ), and the birth of new forms of Confucian activity on the popular level, such as the Confucian communities (shèqū rúxué ). Some scholars also consider the reconstruction of lineage churches and their ancestral temples, as well as of cults and temples of natural gods and national heroes within broader Chinese traditional religion, as part of the renewal of Confucianism.

Other forms of revival are folk religious movements of salvation with a Confucian focus, or Confucian churches, for example the Yidan xuetang of Beijing, the Mengmutang of Shanghai, Confucian Shenism ( Rúzōng Shénjiào) or the phoenix churches, the Confucian Fellowship ( Rújiào Dàotán) of northern Fujian, and ancestral temples of the Kong (Confucius') lineage operating as churches for Confucian teaching.

Also the Hong Kong Confucian Academy, one of the direct heirs of Kang Youwei's Confucian Church, has expanded its activities to the mainland, with the construction of statues of Confucius, the establishment of Confucian hospitals, the restoration of temples and other activities. In 2009, Zhou Beichen founded another institution which inherits the idea of Kang Youwei's Confucian Church, the Sacred Hall of Confucius ( Kǒngshèngtáng) in Shenzhen, affiliated with the Federation of Confucian Culture of Qufu City. It was the first of a nationwide movement of congregations and civil organisations that was unified in 2015 in the Church of Confucius ( Kǒngshènghuì). The first spiritual leader of the church is the scholar Jiang Qing, the founder and manager of the Yangming Confucian Abode ( Yángmíng jīngshě), a Confucian academy in Guiyang, Guizhou.

Chinese folk religious temples and kinship ancestral shrines may, on peculiar occasions, choose Confucian liturgy (called  rú or  zhèngtǒng, "orthoprax") led by Confucian ritual masters ( lǐshēng) to worship the gods, instead of Taoist or popular ritual. "Confucian businessmen" ( rúshāng, also "refined businessman") is a recently rediscovered concept defining people of the economic-entrepreneurial elite who recognise their social responsibility and therefore apply Confucian culture to their business.

Taoism

Taoism ( Dàojiào) (also romanised as Daoism in the current pinyin spelling) encompasses a variety of related orders of philosophy and rite in Chinese religion. They share elements that go back to the 4th century BCE and to the prehistoric culture of China, such as the School of Yin and Yang and the thought of Laozi and Zhuangzi. Taoism has a distinct scriptural tradition, with the Dàodéjīng ( "Book of the Way and its Virtue") of Laozi being regarded as its keystone. Taoism may be described, as does the scholar and Taoist initiate Kristofer Schipper in The Taoist Body (1986), as a doctrinal and liturgical framework or structure for developing the local cults of indigenous religion. Taoist traditions emphasise living in harmony with the Tao (also romanised as Dao). The term Tao means "way", "path" or "principle", and may also be found in Chinese philosophies and religions other than Taoism, including Confucian thought. In Taoism, however, Tao denotes the principle that is both the source and the pattern of development of everything that exists. It is ultimately ineffable: "The Tao that can be told is not the eternal Tao" says the first verse of the Tao Te Ching. According to the scholar Stephan Feuchtwang, the concept of Tao is equivalent to the ancient Greek concept of physis, "nature", that is the vision of the process of generation and regeneration of things and of the moral order.

By the Han dynasty (206 BCE – 220 CE) the various sources of Taoism coalesced into a coherent tradition of religious organisations and orders of ritualists. In earlier China, Taoists were thought of as hermits or ascetics who did not participate in political life. Zhuangzi was the best known of them, and it is significant that he lived in the south, where he was involved in local shamanic traditions. Women shamans played an important role in this tradition, which was particularly strong in the state of Chu. Early Taoist movements developed their own institution in contrast to shamanism, but absorbing fundamental shamanic elements. Shamans revealed texts of Taoism from early times down to at least the 20th century.

Taoist institutional orders evolved in strains that in recent times are conventionally grouped in two main branches: Quanzhen Taoism and Zhengyi Taoism. Taoist schools traditionally feature reverence for Laozi, immortals or ancestors, along with a variety of rituals for divination and exorcism, and techniques for achieving ecstasy, longevity or immortality. Ethics and appropriate behaviour may vary depending on the particular school, but in general all emphasise wu wei (effortless action), "naturalness", simplicity, spontaneity, and the Three Treasures: compassion, moderation, and humility.

Taoism has had profound influence on Chinese culture over the course of the centuries, and Taoists ("masters of the Tao") usually take care to mark the distinction between their ritual tradition and those of vernacular orders which are not recognised as Taoist.

Taoism was suppressed during the Cultural Revolution of the 1960s and early 1970s but its traditions endured in secrecy and revived in following decades. In 1956 a national organisation, the Chinese Taoist Association, was established to govern the activity of Taoist orders and temples. According to demographic analyses, approximately 13% of the population of China claims a loose affiliation with Taoist practices, while self-proclaimed "Taoists" (a title traditionally attributed only to the daoshi, i.e. the priests, who are experts of Taoist doctrines and rites, and to their closest disciples) might be 12 million (c. 1%). The definition of "Taoist" is complicated by the fact that many folk sects of salvation and their members began to be registered as branches of the Taoist association in the 1990s.

There are two types of Taoists, following the distinction between the Quanzhen and Zhengyi traditions. Quanzhen daoshi are celibate monks, and therefore the Taoist temples of the Quanzhen school are monasteries.

While the Chinese Taoist Association started as a Quanzhen institution, and remains based at the White Cloud Temple of Beijing, that also functions as the headquarters of the Quanzhen sects, from the 1990s onwards it started to open registration to the sanju daoshi of the Zhengyi branch, who are more numerous than the Quanzhen monks. The Chinese Taoist Association had already 20.000 registered sanju daoshi in the mid-1990s, while the total number of Zhengyi priests including the unregistered ones was estimated at 200.000 in the same years. The Zhengyi sanju daoshi are trained by other priests of the same sect, and historically received formal ordination by the Celestial Master, although the 63rd Celestial Master Zhang Enpu fled to Taiwan in the 1940s during the Chinese Civil War. Taoism, both in registered and unregistered forms, has experienced a strong development since the 1990s, and dominates the religious life of coastal provinces.

Vernacular ritual mastery traditions

Chinese vernacular ritual masters, also referred to as practitioners of Faism ( Fǎjiào, "rites/laws' traditions"), also named Folk Taoism ( Mínjiàn Dàojiào), or "Red Taoism" (in southeast China and Taiwan), are orders of priests that operate within the Chinese folk religion but outside any institution of official Taoism. Such "masters of rites", fashi, are known by a variety of names including hongtou daoshi, popular in southeast China, meaning "redhead" or "redhat" daoshi, in contradistinction to the wutou daoshi, "blackhead" or "blackhat" daoshi, as vernacular Taoists call the sanju daoshi of Zhengyi Taoism that were traditionally ordained by the Celestial Master. In some provinces of north China they are known as yīnyángshēng ( "sages of yin and yang"), and by a variety of other names.

Although the two types of priests, daoshi and fashi, have the same roles in Chinese society—in that they may marry and they perform rituals for communities' temples or private homes—Zhengyi daoshi emphasise their Taoist tradition, distinguished from the vernacular tradition of the fashi. Some Western scholars have described vernacular Taoist traditions as "cataphatic" (i.e. of positive theology) in character, while professional Taoism as "kenotic" and "apophatic" (i.e. of negative theology).

Fashi are tongji practitioners (southern mediumship), healers, exorcists and they officiate jiao rituals of "universal salvation" (although historically they were excluded from performing such rites). They are not shamans (wu), with the exception of the order of Mount Lu in Jiangxi. Rather, they represent an intermediate level between the wu and the Taoists. Like the wu, the fashi identify with their deity, but while the wu embody wild forces, vernacular ritual masters represent order like the Taoists. Unlike the Taoists, who represent a tradition of high theology which is interethnic, both vernacular ritual masters and wu find their institutional base in local cults to particular deities, even though vernacular ritual masters are itinerant.

Chinese shamanic traditions

Shamanism was the prevalent modality of pre-Han dynasty Chinese indigenous religion. The Chinese usage distinguishes the Chinese "Wuism" tradition ( Wūjiào; properly shamanic, in which the practitioner has control over the force of the god and may travel to the underworld) from the tongji tradition (southern mediumship, in which the practitioner does not control the force of the god but is guided by it), and from non-Han Chinese Altaic shamanisms ( sàmǎnjiào) which are practised in northern provinces.

With the rise of Confucian orthodoxy in the Han period (206 BCE – 220 CE), shamanic traditions found an institutionalised and intellectualised form within the esoteric philosophical discourse of Taoism. According to Chirita (2014), Confucianism itself, with its emphasis on hierarchy and ancestral rituals, derived from the shamanic discourse of the Shang dynasty (c. 1600 BCE – 1046 BCE). What Confucianism did was to marginalise the features of old shamanism which were dysfunctional for the new political regime. However, shamanic traditions continued uninterrupted within the folk religion and found precise and functional forms within Taoism.

In the Shang and later Zhou dynasty (c. 1046 BCE – 256 BCE), shamans had an important role in the political hierarchy, and were represented institutionally by the Ministry of Rites. The emperor was considered the supreme shaman, intermediating between the three realms of heaven, earth and humanity. The mission of a shaman ( wu) is "to repair the dysfunctionalities occurred in nature and generated after the sky had been separated from earth":

Since the 1980s the practice and study of shamanism has undergone a great revival in Chinese religion as a mean to repair the world to a harmonious whole after industrialisation. Shamanism is viewed by many scholars as the foundation for the emergence of civilisation, and the shaman as "teacher and spirit" of peoples. The Chinese Society for Shamanic Studies was founded in Jilin City in 1988.

Buddhism

In China, Buddhism ( Fójiào) is represented by a large number of people following the Mahayana, divided between two different cultural traditions, namely the schools of Chinese Buddhism followed by the Han Chinese, and the schools of Tibetan Buddhism followed by Tibetans and Mongols, but also by minorities of Han. The vast majority of Buddhists in China, counted in the hundreds of millions, are Chinese Buddhists, while Tibetan Buddhists are in the number of the tens of millions. Small communities following the Theravada exist among minority ethnic groups who live in the southwestern provinces of Yunnan and Guangxi, bordering Myanmar, Thailand and Laos, but also some among the Li people of Hainan follow such tradition.

With the establishment of the People's Republic of China in 1949, religion came under the control of the new government, and the Buddhist Association of China was founded in 1953. During the Cultural Revolution, Buddhism was suppressed and temples closed or destroyed. Restrictions lasted until the reforms of the 1980s, when Buddhism began to recover popularity and its place as the largest organised faith in the country. While estimates of the number of Buddhists in China vary, the most recent surveys found an average 10–16% of the population of China claiming a Buddhist affiliation, with even higher percentages in urban agglomerations.

Chinese Buddhism

Buddhism was introduced into China by its western neighbouring populations during the Han dynasty, traditionally in the 1st century. It became very popular among Chinese of all walks of life; admired by commoners, and sponsored by emperors in certain dynasties. The expansion of Buddhism reached its peak during the Tang dynasty, in the 9th century, when Buddhist monasteries had become very rich and powerful. The wealth of Buddhist institutions was among the practical reasons—the ideal reason was that Buddhism was a "foreign religion"—why the Tang emperors decided to enact a wave of persecutions of the religion, starting with the Great Anti-Buddhist Persecution (845) by Emperor Wuzong, through which many monasteries were destroyed and the religion's influence in China was greatly reduced. However, Buddhism survived the persecutions and regained a place in the Chinese society over the following centuries.

Spreading in China, Buddhism had to interact with indigenous religions, especially Taoism. Such interaction gave rise to uniquely Han Chinese Buddhist schools ( Hànchuán Fójiào). Originally seen as a kind of "foreign Taoism", Buddhism's scriptures were translated into Chinese using the Taoist vocabulary. Chan Buddhism in particular was shaped by Taoism, developing distrust of scriptures and even language, as well as typical Taoist views emphasising "this life", the "moment", and dedicated practices. Throughout the Tang period, Taoism itself developed elements drawn from Buddhism, including monasticism, vegetarianism, abstention from alcohol, and the doctrine of emptiness. During the same period, Chan Buddhism grew to become the largest sect in Chinese Buddhism.

Buddhism was not universally welcomed, particularly among the gentry. The Buddha's teaching seemed alien and amoral to conservative Confucian sensibilities. Confucianism promoted social stability, order, strong families, and practical living, and Chinese officials questioned how monasticism and personal attainment of Nirvana benefited the empire. However, Buddhism and Confucianism eventually reconciled after centuries of conflict and assimilation.

In contemporary China, the most popular forms of Chinese Buddhism are the Pure Land and Chan schools. Pure Land Buddhism is very accessible for common people, since in its doctrine even lay practitioners may escape the cycle of death and rebirth. The goal for followers of this popular form of Buddhism is to be reborn in the Pure Land, which is a place rather than a state of mind. In the 2000s and 2010s, the influence of Chinese Buddhism has been expressed through the construction of large-scale statues, pagodas and temples, including the Great Buddha of the Central Plains, the second highest statue in the world. Many temples in China also claim to preserve relics of the original Gautama Buddha.

The revival of Chinese Buddhism in the 21st century has also seen the development of the Humanistic Buddhist movement, reintroduced from Taiwan and Chinese overseas communities, with organisations such as the Cíjì, which has been working in mainland China since 1991 and has opened its mainland headquarters in the 2010s in Suzhou.

Tibetan Buddhism

The Buddhist schools that emerged in the cultural sphere of Tibet ( Zàngchuán Fójiào or  Lǎmajiào, "Lamaism") also have an influence throughout China that dates back to historical interactions of the Han Chinese with neighbouring populations. Tibetan Buddhism and its clergy, the lamas, were introduced in China proper since the 7th century; its emphasis on ritual action was a shared element with Taoism. It spread significantly much later, with Tibetan influence in the west, and with the Mongols and Manchus in the north, especially under the dynasties which they established in China, the Yuan and the Qing dynasty.

Today, Tibetan Buddhism is the dominant religion in Tibet, among Tibetans in Qinghai and other provinces, and has a historical and significant presence in Inner Mongolia (where its traditional name is Burkhany Shashin, "Buddha's religion", or Shira-in Shashin, the "Yellow religion"— Huángjiào in Chinese). However, there are many Tibetan Buddhist temples as far as northeast China, the Yonghe Temple in Beijing being just one example.

There are controversies surrounding the Tibetan Buddhist hierarchy, specifically the succession of Tenzin Gyatso the 14th Dalai Lama—the spiritual leader of the Gelug school, the major school of Tibetan Buddhism—who, before fleeing China during the 1959 Tibetan uprising, had full political power in Tibet. The Panchen Lama, the Tibetan hierarch in charge of the designation of the future successor of the Dalai Lama, is a matter of controversy between the Chinese government and Tenzin Gyatso. The government of China asserts that the present (11th) incarnation of the Panchen Lama is Gyancain Norbu, while the 14th Dalai Lama asserted in 1995 that it was Gedhun Choekyi Nyima, who from that year has been detained by the Chinese government and never seen in public.

After the liberalisation of religions in China in the 1980s, there has been a growing movement of adoption of the Gelug sect, and other Tibetan-originated Buddhist schools, by the Han Chinese. This movement has been favoured by the proselytism of Chinese-speaking Tibetan lamas throughout China.

Theravada Buddhism

Theravada Buddhism is a major form of Buddhism, practised mostly in Southeast Asia but also among some minority ethnic groups in southwest China. Theravada Buddhism spread from Myanmar to present day Xishuangbanna, Dehong, Simao, Lincang, and Baoshan, all in Yunnan, during the 6th and 7th century. Today, this school of Buddhism is popular among the Dai people, and also the Palaung, Blang, Achang, and Jingpo ethnic groups.

The first Buddhist temple in Yunnan province, the Wabajie Temple in Xishuangbanna, was erected in 615. After the 12th century, Theravada Buddhist influence into the region began to come from Thailand. Thais began to bring copies of the Pali canon to Yunnan, to translate the scriptures and to build new temples. The people living in Yunnan where Theravada Buddhism is widespread follow norms similar to those of Thai Buddhists, and their Buddhism is often blended with local folk beliefs. Theravada Buddhism suffered from persecution during the Cultural Revolution, but after the 1980s it was revived.

Vajrayana Buddhism

Besides Tibetan Buddhism and the Vajrayana streams found within Chinese Buddhism, Vajrayana Buddhism is practised in China in some other forms. For instance, Azhaliism (Chinese:  Āzhālìjiào) is a Vajrayana Buddhist religion practised among the Bai people.

The Vajrayana current of Chinese Buddhism is known as Tangmi ( "Tang Mysteries"), as it flourished in China during the Tang dynasty (618–907) just before the great suppression of Buddhism by imperial decision. Another name for this body of traditions is "Han Chinese Transmission of the Esoteric (or Mystery) Tradition" ( Hànchuán Mìzōng, where Mizong is the Chinese for Vajrayana). Tangmi, together with the broader religious tradition of Tantrism (in Chinese:  Dátèluō or  Dátèluó mìjiào; which may include Hindu forms of religion) has undergone a revitalisation since the 1980s together with the overall revival of Buddhism.

The Gateway of the Hidden Flower ( Huácáng Zōngmén) and the True Awakening Tradition ( Zhēnfó Zōng) are two new Han Chinese movements within the Vajrayana, and are among the Buddhist sects which are officially proscribed as evil by the government.

Japanese Buddhism

Shin Buddhism

From the 1890s to the end of the Second Sino-Japanese War in 1945, the Hompa Honganji-ha organisation of the Jōdo Shinshū (淨土真宗; Chinese reading: Jìngtǔ Zhēnzōng, "True Tradition of the Pure Land"), or Shin Buddhism ("True Buddhism"), which is a Japanese variation of Pure Land Buddhism, carried out missionary activity throughout East Asia, including Manchuria, Taiwan and China proper. With the unconditional surrender of Japan at the end of the war, the missions were shut down.

Starting in the 1990s there has been a revival of Shin Buddhism among the Chinese, which has taken a formal nature with the foundation of the Hong Kong Fǎléi Niànfóhuì in 2000, followed by the Fuzhou Fǎléi Niànfóhuì founded in 2006 and the Shaanxi Fǎléi Niànfóhuì founded in 2010. There are Shin Buddhist groups also in Henan, Zhejiang, Inner Mongolia, Yunnan and other provinces.

The propagation of Shin Buddhism in China has faced some critiques for cultural, historical and doctrinal reasons. Cultural critiques point to the fact that Shin Buddhist clerics may marry and eat meat; modern Chinese Shin Buddhist groups, however, tend to follow the norms of celibacy and vegetarianism of Chinese Buddhism. Historical critiques have to do with the links that Jodo Shinshu had with Japanese militarism and colonialism prior to 1945. Doctrinal critiques are based on the attribution of "unfiliality" to Shin Buddhism, because it was not influenced by Chinese folk religion as Chinese Buddhism was, and therefore does not have firmly established practices for ancestor worship.

Nichiren Buddhism

Nichiren Buddhism, a denomination of the Buddhist religion that was founded in Japan in the 13th century, has been spreading in China in the 21st century in the form of the Soka Gakkai (in Chinese:  Chuàngjià xuéhuì). Nichiren Buddhism was founded by the monk Nichiren (1222–1282), who elaborated his teachings upon the "Lotus Sutra" aspiring to reform Buddhism. Nichiren Buddhism promises both immediate relief from daily problems as well as this-worldly benefits. This society has engaged in missionary efforts in China partially aided by the good relationship it has interlaced with the Chinese government. Delegations from the Japanese Soka Gakkai and the Chinese government and intellectual class have made visits to each other, so that the society has been called an "intimate friend of the Chinese government". Soka Gakkai members in China are organised in the form of the house church, as they "meet quietly in small groups in the homes of other members", with little interference from the government.

Ethnic minorities' indigenous religions
Various Chinese non-Han minority populations practise unique indigenous religions. The government of China protects and valorises the indigenous religions of minority ethnicities as the foundations of their culture and identity.

Benzhuism (Bai)

Benzhuism ( Běnzhǔjiào, "religion of the patrons") is the indigenous religion of the Bai people, an ethnic group of Yunnan. It consists in the worship of the ngel zex, Bai word for "patrons" or "source lords", rendered as benzhu in Chinese. They are local gods and deified ancestors of the Bai nation. Benzhuism is very similar to Han Chinese religion.

Bimoism (Yi)

Bimoism ( Bìmójiào) is the indigenous religion of the Yi people, the largest ethnic group in Yunnan after the Han Chinese. This faith is represented by three types of religious specialists: the bimo ("ritual masters", "priests"), the sunyi (male shamans) and the monyi (female shamans).

What distinguishes the bimo and the shamans is the way through which they acquire their authority. While both are regarded as the "mediators between humanity and the divine", the shamans are initiated through a "spiritual inspiration" (which involves illness or vision) whereas the bimo—who are always males with few exceptions—are literates, who may read and write traditional Yi script, have a tradition of theological and ritual scriptures, and are initiated through a tough educational process.

Since the 1980s, Bimoism has undergone a comprehensive revitalisation, both on the popular level and on the scholarly level, with the bimo now celebrated as an "intellectual class" whose role is that of creators, preservers and transmitters of Yi high culture. Since the 1990s, Bimoism has undergone an institutionalisation, starting with the foundation of the Bimo Culture Research Center in Meigu County in 1996. The founding of the centre received substantial support from local authorities, especially those whose families were directly affiliated with one of the many bimo hereditary lineages. Since then, large temples and ceremonial complexes for Bimoist practices have been built.

Bon (Tibetans)

"Bon" (Tibetan: བོན་; Chinese:  Běnjiào) is the post-Buddhist name of the pre-Buddhist folk religion of Tibet. Buddhism spread into Tibet starting in the 7th and 8th century, and the name "Bon" was adopted as the name of the indigenous religion in Buddhist historiography. Originally, bon was the title of the shamans of the Tibetan indigenous religion. This is in analogy with the names of the priests of the folk religions of other peoples related to the Tibetans, such as the dong ba of the Nakhi or the bø of Mongolians and other Siberian peoples. Bonpo ("believers of Bon") claim that the word bon means "truth" and "reality".

The spiritual source of Bon is the mythical figure of Tonpa Shenrab Miwoche. Since the late 10th century, the religion then designated as "Bon" started to organise itself adopting the style of Tibetan Buddhism, including a monastic structure and a Bon Canon (Kangyur), which made it a codified religion. The Chinese sage Confucius is worshipped in Bon as a holy king, master of magic and divination.

Dongbaism (Nakhi)

Dongbaism ( Dōngbajiào, "religion of the eastern Ba") is the main religion of the Nakhi people. The "dongba" ("eastern ba") are masters of the culture, literature and the script of the Nakhi. They originated as masters of the Tibetan Bon religion ("Ba" in Nakhi language), many of whom, in times of persecution when Buddhism became the dominant religion in Tibet, were expelled and dispersed to the eastern marches settling among Nakhi and other eastern peoples.

Dongbaism historically formed as beliefs brought by Bon masters commingled with older indigenous Nakhi beliefs. Dongba followers believe in a celestial shaman called Shi-lo-mi-wu, with little doubt the same as the Tibetan Shenrab Miwo. They worship nature and generation, in the form of many heavenly gods and spirits, chthonic Shu (spirits of the earth represented in the form of chimera-dragon-serpent beings), and ancestors.

Manchu folk religion

Manchu folk religion is the ethnic religion practised by most of the Manchu people, the major of the Tungusic peoples, in China. It may also be called "Manchu Shamanism" ( Mǎnzú sàmǎnjiào) by virtue of the word "shaman" being originally from Tungusic šamán ("man of knowledge"), later applied by Western scholars to similar religious practices in other cultures.

It is a pantheistic system, believing in a universal God called Apka Enduri ("God of Heaven") that is the omnipotent and omnipresent source of all life and creation. Deities (enduri) enliven every aspect of nature, and the worship of these gods is believed to bring favour, health and prosperity. Many of the deities are original Manchu kins' ancestors, and people with the same surname are viewed as being generated by the same god.

Miao folk religion

Most of the Miao people (or Hmong) in China have retained their traditional folk religion. It is pantheistic and deeply influenced by Chinese religion, sharing the concept of yeeb ceeb and yaj ceeb representing, respectively, the realm of the gods in potentiality and the manifested or actual world of living things as a complementary duality.

The Miao believe in a supreme universal God, Saub, who may be defined a deus otiosus who created reality and left it to develop according to its ways, but nonetheless may be appealed in times of need. He entrusted a human, Siv Yis, with healing powers so that he became the first shaman. After his death, Siv Yis ascended to heaven, but he left behind his ritual tools that became the equipment of the shaman class. They (txiv neeb) regard Siv Yis as their archetype and identify as him when they are imbued by the gods.

Various gods (dab or neeb, the latter defining those who work with shamans) enliven the world. Among them, the most revered are the water god Dragon King (Zaj Laug), the Thunder God (Xob), the gods of life and death (Ntxwj Nyug and Nyuj Vaj Tuam Teem), Lady Sun (Nkauj Hnub) and Lord Moon (Nraug Hli), and various deified human ancestors.

Mongolian folk religion 

Mongolian folk religion, that is Mongolian shamanism ( Ménggǔzú sàmǎnjiào), alternatively named Tengerism ( Ténggélǐjiào), is the native and major religion among the Mongols of China, mostly residing in the region of Inner Mongolia.

It is centred on the worship of the tngri (gods) and the highest Tenger (Heaven, God of Heaven, God) or Qormusta Tengri. In Mongolian folk religion, Genghis Khan is considered one of the embodiments, if not the most important embodiment, of the Tenger. In worship, communities of lay believers are led by shamans (called böge if males, iduγan if females), who are intermediaries of the divine.

Since the 1980s there has been an unprecedented development of Mongolian folk religion in Inner Mongolia, including böge, the cult of Genghis Khan and the Heaven in special temples (many of which built in a style resembling yurts), and the cult of aobao as ancestral shrines. Han Chinese of Inner Mongolia have easily assimilated into the traditional Mongolian spiritual heritage of the region. The cult of Genghis is also shared by the Han, claiming his spirit as the founding principle of the Yuan dynasty.

 ( áobāo) are sacrificial altars of the shape of mounds that are traditionally used for worship by Mongols and related ethnic groups. Every aobao represents a god; there are  dedicated to heavenly gods, mountain gods, other gods of nature, and also to gods of human lineages and agglomerations.

The  for worship of ancestral gods may be private shrines of an extended family or kin (people sharing the same surname), otherwise they are common to villages (dedicated to the god of a village), banners or leagues.

Qiang folk religion 

Qiang people are mostly followers of a native Qiang folk religion. It is pantheistic, involving the worship of a variety of gods of nature and of human affairs, including Qiang progenitors. White stones are worshipped as it is believed that they may be invested with the power of the gods through rituals. Qiang people believe in an overarching God, called Mubyasei ("God of Heaven"), which is related with the Chinese concept of Tian and clearly identified by the Qiang with the Taoist-originated Jade Deity.

Religious ceremonies and rituals are directed by priests called duāngōng in Chinese. They are shamans who acquire their position through years of training with a teacher. Duāngōng are the custodians of Qiang theology, history and mythology. They also administer the coming of age ceremony for 18 years-old boys, called the "sitting on top of the mountain", which involves the boy's entire family going to mountain tops, to sacrifice a sheep or cow and to plant three cypress trees.

Two of the most important religious holidays are the Qiang New Year, falling on the 24th day of the sixth month of the lunar calendar (though now it is fixed on 1 October), and the Mountain Sacrifice Festival, held between the second and the sixth month of the lunar calendar. The former festival is to worship the God of Heaven, while the latter is dedicated to the god of mountains.

Yao folk religion 

The Yao people, who reside in Guangxi and Hunan and surrounding provinces, follow a folk religion that is deeply integrated with Taoism since the 13th century, so much that it is frequently defined as "Yao Taoism". Yao folk religion was described by a Chinese scholar of the half of the 20th century as an example of deep "Taoisation" ( Dàojiàohuà). In the 1980s it was found that the Yao clearly identified themselves with Chinese-language Taoist theological literature, seen as a prestigious statute of culture ( wénhuà).

The reason of such strong identification of Yao religion with Taoism is that in Yao society every male adult is initiated as a Taoist. Yao Taoism is therefore a communal religion, not identifying just a class of priests but the entire body of the society; this contrasts with Chinese Taoism, which mostly developed as a collection of sacerdotal orders. The shared sense of Yao identity is further based on tracing back Yao origins to a mythical ancestor, Panhu.

Zhuang folk religion 

Zhuang folk religion, sometimes called Moism ( Mójiào) or Shigongism ( Shīgōngjiào, "religion of the [Zhuang] ancestral father"), after two of its forms, is practised by most of the Zhuang people, the largest ethnic minority of China, who inhabit the province of Guangxi. It is a polytheistic-monistic and shamanic religion centered on the creator god usually expressed as Buluotuo, the mythical primordial ancestor of the Zhuang. Its beliefs are codified into a mythology and a sacred scripture, the "Buluotuo Epic". A very similar religion, also called by the same name, is that of the Buyei people, who are kindred to the Zhuang.

The Zhuang religion is intertwined with Taoism. Indeed, Chinese scholars divide the Zhuang religion into several categories according to the type of ritual specialists who conduct the rites; these categories include Shigongism, Moism, Daogongism ( Dàogōngjiào) and shamanism ( wūjiào).

"Shigongism" refers to the dimension led by the shīgōng ritual specialists, a term which may be translated variously as "ancestral father" or "teaching master", and which refers both to the principle of the universe (God) and to the men who are able to represent it. Shīgōng specialists practise masked dancing and worship the Three Primordials, the generals Tang, Ge and Zhou. "Moism" refers to the dimension led by mógōng, who are vernacular ritual specialists able to transcribe and read texts written in Zhuang characters and lead the worship of Buluotuo and of the goddess Muliujia. "Daogongism" is Zhuang Taoism, that is the indigenous religion directed by Zhuang Taoists, known as dàogōng ( "lords of the Tao") in the Zhuang language, according to Taoist doctrines and rites. Zhuang shamanism entails the practices of mediums who provide direct communication between the material and the spiritual worlds; these shamans are known as  if female and  if male.

Since the 1980s and the 1990s there has been a revival of Zhuang folk religion, which has followed two directions. The first is a grassroots revival of cults dedicated to local deities and ancestors, led by shamans; the second way is a promotion of the religion on the institutional level, through a standardisation of Moism elaborated by Zhuang government officials and intellectuals.

Abrahamic religions

Christianity 

Christianity ( Jīdūjiào, "Religion of Christ") in China comprises Roman Catholicism ( Tiānzhǔjiào, "Religion of the Lord of Heaven"), Protestantism ( Jīdūjiào Xīnjiào, "New-Christianity"), and a small number of Orthodox Christians ( Zhèngjiào). Mormonism ( Móménjiào) also has a tiny presence. The Orthodox Church, which has believers among the Russian minority and some Chinese in the far northeast and far northwest, is officially recognised in Heilongjiang. The category of "Protestantism" in China also comprehends a variety of heterodox sects of Christian inspiration, including Zhushenism ( Zhǔshénjiào, "Church of Lord God"), Linglingism ( Línglíngjiào, "Numinous Church"), Fuhuodao, the Church of the Disciples ( Méntúhuì) and Eastern Lightning or the Church of Almighty God ( Quánnéngshénjiào).

Christianity existed in China as early as the 7th century, living multiple cycles of significant presence for centuries, then disappearing for other centuries, and then being re-introduced by foreign missionaries. The arrival of the Persian missionary Alopen in 635, during the early period of the Tang dynasty, is considered by some to be the first entry of Christianity in China. What Westerners referred to as Nestorianism flourished for centuries, until Emperor Wuzong of the Tang in 845 ordained that all foreign religions (Buddhism, Christianity and Zoroastrianism) had to be eradicated from the Chinese nation. Christianity was reintroduced in China in the 13th century, in the form of Nestorianism, during the Mongol Yuan dynasty, which also established relations with the papacy, especially through Franciscan missionaries in 1294. When the native Han Chinese Ming dynasty overthrew the Yuan dynasty in the 14th century, Christianity was again expelled from China as a foreign influence.

At the end of the Ming dynasty in the 16th century, Jesuits arrived in Beijing via Guangzhou. The most famous amongst them was Matteo Ricci, an Italian mathematician who came to China in 1588 and lived in Beijing. Ricci was welcomed at the imperial court and introduced Western learning into China. The Jesuits followed a policy of adaptation of Catholicism to traditional Chinese religious practices, especially ancestor worship. However, such practices were eventually condemned as polytheistic idolatry by the popes Clement XI, Clement XII and Benedict XIV. Roman Catholic missions struggled in obscurity for decades afterwards.

Christianity began to take root in a significant way in the late imperial period, during the Qing dynasty, and although it has remained a minority religion in China, it influenced late imperial history. Waves of missionaries came to China in the Qing period as a result of contact with foreign powers. Russian Orthodoxy was introduced in 1715, and Protestant missions began entering China in 1807. The pace of missionary activity increased considerably after the First Opium War in 1842. Christian missionaries and their schools, under the protection of the Western powers, went on to play a major role in the Westernisation of China in the 19th and 20th centuries.

The Taiping Rebellion (1850–1871) was influenced to some degree by Christian teachings, and the Boxer Rebellion (1899–1901) was in part a reaction against Christianity in China. Christians in China established the first clinics and hospitals practising modern medicine, and provided the first modern training for nurses. Both Roman Catholics and Protestants founded numerous educational institutions in China from the primary to the university level. Some of the most prominent Chinese universities began as religious institutions. Missionaries worked to abolish practices such as foot binding, and the unjust treatment of maidservants, as well as launching charitable work and distributing food to the poor. They also opposed the opium trade and brought treatment to many who were addicted. Some of the early leaders of the early republic (1912–49), such as Sun Yat-sen, were converts to Christianity and were influenced by its teachings. By 1921, Harbin, Manchuria's largest city, had a Russian population of around 100,000, constituting a large part of Christianity in the city.

Christianity, especially in its Protestant form, gained momentum in China between the 1980s and the 1990s, but, in the following years, folk religion recovered more rapidly and in greater numbers than Christianity (or Buddhism). The scholar Richard Madsen noted that "the Christian God then becomes one in a pantheon of local gods among whom the rural population divides its loyalties". Similarly, Gai Ronghua and Gao Junhui noted that "Christianity in China is no longer monotheism" and tends to blend with Chinese folk religion, as many Chinese Christians take part in regional activities for the worship of gods and ancestors.

Protestants in the early 21st century, including both official and unofficial churches, had between 25 and 35 million adherents. Catholics were not more than 10 million. In the 2010s the scholarly estimate was of approximately 30 million Christians, of whom fewer than 4 million were Catholics. In the same years, about 40 million Chinese said they believed in Jesus Christ or had attended Christian meetings, but did not identify themselves with the Christian religion. Demographic analyses usually find an average 2–3% of the population of China declaring a Christian affiliation. According the Pew Forum on Religion & Public Life, before 1949, there were approximately were 4 million Christians (3 million Catholics and 1 million Protestants), and by 2010, China had roughly 67 million Christians, representing about 5% of the country's total population. Christians were unevenly distributed geographically, the only provinces in which they constituted a population significantly larger than 1 million persons being Henan, Anhui and Zhejiang. Protestants were characterised by a prevalence of people living in the countryside, women, illiterates and semi-literates, and elderly people. While according to the Yu Tao survey  the Catholic population were characterised by a prevalence of men, wealthier, better educated, and young people. A 2017 study on the Christian community of Wuhan found the same socio-economic characteristics, with the addition that Christians were more likely than the general population to suffer from physical and mental illness. In 2018, the government published a report saying that there are over 44 million Christians (38M Protestants; 6M Catholics) in China.

A significant number of members of churches unregistered with the government, and of their pastors, belong to the Koreans of China. Christianity has a strong presence in the Yanbian Korean Autonomous Prefecture, in Jilin. Yanbian Koreans' Christianity has a patriarchal character; Korean churches are usually led by men, in contrast to Chinese churches that most often have female leadership. For instance, of the twenty-eight registered churches of Yanji, only three of which are Chinese congregations, all the Korean churches have a male pastor while all the Chinese churches have a female pastor. Also, Korean church buildings are stylistically very similar to South Korean churches, with big spires surmounted by red crosses. Yanbian Korean churches have been a matter of controversy for the Chinese government because of their links to South Korean churches.

According to a report by the Singapore Management University, from the 1980s onwards, more people in China and other Asian countries have converted to Christianity, and these new converts are mostly “upwardly mobile, urban, middle-class Chinese”. According to the Council on Foreign Relations the "number of Chinese Protestants has grown by an average of 10 percent annually since 1979". According to The Economist, "Protestant Christianity is booming in China". If the current trend continues, China will have the largest Christian population in the world as some have estimated.

In recent decades the CCP has remained intolerant of Christian churches outside party control, looking with distrust on organisations with international ties. The government and Chinese intellectuals tend to associate Christianity with subversive Western values, and many churches have been closed or destroyed. In addition, Western and Korean missionaries are being expelled. Since the 2010s policies against Christianity have been extended also to Hong Kong.

In September 2018, the Holy See and the Chinese government signed the 2018 Holy See-China Agreement, a historic agreement concerning the appointment of bishops in China. The Vatican spokesman Greg Burke described the agreement as "not political but pastoral, allowing the faithful to have bishops who are in communion with Rome but at the same time recognized by Chinese authorities".

Islam

The introduction of Islam ( Yīsīlánjiào or  Huíjiào) in China is traditionally dated back to a diplomatic mission in 651, eighteen years after Muhammad's death, led by Sa'd ibn Abi Waqqas. Emperor Gaozong is said to have shown esteem for Islam and to have founded the Huaisheng Mosque (Memorial Mosque) at Guangzhou, in memory of the Prophet himself.

Muslims, mainly Arabs, travelled to China to trade. In the year 760, the Yangzhou massacre killed large numbers of these traders, and a century later, in the years 878–879, Chinese rebels fatally targeted the Arab community in the Guangzhou massacre. Yet, Muslims virtually came to dominate the import and export industry by the Song dynasty (960–1279). The office of Director General of Shipping was consistently held by a Muslim. Immigration increased during the Yuan dynasty (1271–1368), when hundreds of thousands of Muslims were relocated throughout China for their administrative skills. A Muslim, Yeheidie'erding, led the construction project of the Yuan capital of Khanbaliq, in present-day Beijing.

During the Ming dynasty (1368–1644), Muslims continued to have an influence among the high classes. Hongwu Emperor's most trusted generals were Muslim, including Lan Yu, who led a decisive victory over the Mongols, effectively ending the Mongol dream to re-conquer China. The admiral Zheng He led seven expeditions to the Indian Ocean. The Hongwu Emperor even composed The Hundred-word Eulogy in praise of Muhammad. Muslims who were descended from earlier immigrants began to assimilate by speaking Chinese dialects and by adopting Chinese names and culture, mixing with the Han Chinese. They developed their own cuisine, architecture, martial arts' styles and calligraphy (sini). This era, sometimes considered a Golden Age of Islam in China, also saw Nanjing become an important center of Islamic study.

The rise of the Qing dynasty saw numerous Islamic rebellions, including the Panthay Rebellion which occurred in Yunnan from 1855 to 1873, and the Dungan Revolt, which occurred mostly in Xinjiang, Shaanxi and Gansu from 1862 to 1877. The Manchu government ordered the execution of all rebels, killing a million Muslims after the Panthay Rebellion, and several million after the Dungan Revolt. However, many Muslims like Ma Zhan'ao, Ma Anliang, Dong Fuxiang, Ma Qianling and Ma Julung, defected to the Qing dynasty side and helped the Qing general Zuo Zongtang to exterminate the rebels. These Muslim generals belonged to the Khufiyya sect, while rebels belonged to the Jahariyya sect. In 1895, another Dungan Revolt (1895–96) broke out, and loyalist Muslims like Dong Fuxiang, Ma Anliang, Ma Guoliang, Ma Fulu, and Ma Fuxiang massacred the rebel Muslims led by Ma Dahan, Ma Yonglin, and Ma Wanfu. A few years later, an Islamic army called the Kansu Braves, led by the general Dong Fuxiang, fought for the Qing dynasty against the foreigners during the Boxer Rebellion.

After the fall of the Qing, Sun Yat-sen proclaimed that the country belonged equally to the Han, Manchu, Mongol, Tibetan and Hui peoples. In the 1920s, the provinces of Qinghai, Gansu and Ningxia came under the control of Muslim warlords known as the Ma clique, who served as generals in the National Revolutionary Army. During the Cultural Revolution, mosques were often defaced, closed or demolished, and copies of the Quran were destroyed by the Red Guards.

After the 1980s Islam experienced a renewal in China, with an upsurge in Islamic expression and the establishment Islamic associations aimed to coordinate inter-ethnic activities among Muslims. Muslims are found in every province of China, but they constitute a majority only in Xinjiang, and a large amount of the population in Ningxia and Qinghai. Of China's recognised ethnic minorities, ten groups are traditionally Islamic. Accurate statistics on China's Muslim population are hard to find; various surveys found that they constitute 1–2% of the population of China, or between 10 and 20 million people. In the 2010s they were served by 35,000 to 45,000 mosques, 40,000 to 50,000 imams (ahong), and 10 Quranic institutions.

Judaism

Judaism ( Yóutàijiào) was introduced during the Tang dynasty (618–907) or earlier, by small groups of Jews settled in China. The most prominent early community were the so-called Kaifeng Jews, in Kaifeng, Henan province. In the 20th century many Jews arrived in Hong Kong, Shanghai, and Harbin, during a period of great economic development of these cities. Many of them sought refuge from anti-Semitic pogroms in the Russian Empire (early 1900s), the communist revolution and civil war in Russia (1917–1918), and anti-Semitic Nazi policy in central Europe, chiefly in Germany and Austria (1937–1940). The last wave of Jewish refugees came from Poland and other eastern European countries in the early 1940s.

Shanghai was particularly notable for its numerous Jewish refugees, who gathered in the so-called Shanghai Ghetto. Most of them left China after the war, the rest relocating prior to, or immediately after, the establishment of the People's Republic. Today, the Kaifeng Jewish community is functionally extinct. Many descendants of the Kaifeng community still live among the Chinese population, mostly unaware of their Jewish ancestry, while some have moved to Israel. Meanwhile, remnants of the later arrivals maintain communities in Shanghai and Hong Kong. In recent years a community has also developed in Beijing through the work of the Chabad-Lubavitch movement.

Since the late 20th century, along with the study of religion in general, the study of Judaism and Jews in China as an academic subject has blossomed with the establishment of institutions such as Diane and Guilford Glazer Institute of Jewish Studies and the China Judaic Studies Association.

Baháʼí Faith

The Baháʼí Faith ( Bāhāyī xìnyǎng,  Bāhāyījiào, or, in old translations,  Dàtóngjiào) has had a presence in China since the 19th century.

Other religions

Hinduism

Hinduism ( Yìndùjiào) entered China around the same time as Buddhism, generally imported by Indian merchants, from different routes. One of them was the "Silk Route by Sea" that started from the Coromandel Coast in southeast India and reached Southeast Asia and then southeastern Chinese cities; another route was that from the ancient kingdom of Kamrupa, through upper Burma, reaching Yunnan; a third route is the well-known Silk Route reaching northwest China, which was the main route through which Buddhism spread into China. Archeological remains of Hindu temples and typical Hindu icons have been found in coastal cities of China and in Dali, Yunnan. It is recorded that in 758 there were three Hindu temples in Guangzhou, with resident Hindus, and Hindu temples in Quanzhou. Remains of Hindu temples have also been discovered in Xinjiang, and they are of an earlier date than those in southeast China.

Hindu texts were translated into Chinese, including a large number of Indian Tantric texts and the Vedas, which are known in Chinese as the Minglun or Zhilun, or through phonetic transliteration as the Weituo, Feituo or Pituo. Various Chinese Buddhist monks dedicated themselves to the study of Hindu scriptures, thought and practice. In the Sui (581–618) and later Tang dynasty (618–907), Hindu texts translated into Chinese included the Śulvasūtra, the Śulvaśāstra and the Prescriptions of Brahmin Rishis. The Tibetans contributed with the translation into Chinese of the Pāṇinisūtra and the Rāmāyaṇa.

In the 7th century there was an intellectual exchange between Taoists and Shaktas in India, with the translation of the Daodejing in Sanskrit. Some breathing techniques practised in Shaktism are known as Cīnācāra ("Chinese Practice"), and the Shakta tantras that discuss them trace their origin to Taoism. Two of these tantras report that the Shakta master Vaśiṣṭha paid visit to China specifically with the purpose of learning Cīnācāra from the Taoists. According to the Tamil text Śaivāgama of Pashupata Shaivism, two of the eighteen siddha of southern Shaktism, Bogar and Pulipani, were ethnically Chinese. Shaktism itself was practised in China in the Tang period.

The effect of Hinduism in China is also evident in various gods, originally of Hindu origin, which have been absorbed into the Chinese folk religion. A glaring example is the god Hanuman, who gave rise to the Chinese god Hóuwáng ( "Monkey King"), known as Sun Wukong in the Journey to the West. In the last decades there has been a growth of modern, transnational forms of Hinduism in China: Yogic ("Yoga" is rendered as  Yújiā, literally the "Jade Maiden"), Tantric, and Krishnaite groups (the Bhagavad Gita has been recently translated and published in China) have appeared in many urban centres including Beijing, Shanghai, Chengdu, Shenzhen, Wuhan and Harbin.

Manichaeism

Manichaeism ( Móníjiào or  Míngjiào, "bright transmission") was introduced in China together with Christianity in the 7th century, by land from Central Asia and by sea through south-eastern ports. Based on Gnostic teachings and able to adapt to different cultural contexts, the Manichaean religion spread rapidly both westward to the Roman Empire and eastward to China. Historical sources speak of the religion being introduced in China in 694, though this may have happened much earlier. Manichaeans in China at the time held that their religion was first brought to China by Mōzak under Emperor Gaozong of Tang (650–83). Later, the Manichaean bishop Mihr-Ohrmazd, who was Mōzak's pupil, also came to China, where he was granted an audience by empress Wu Zetian (684–704), and according to later Buddhist sources he presented at the throne the Erzongjing ("Text of the Two Principles") that became the most popular Manichaean scripture in China.

Manichaeism had a bad reputation among Tang dynasty authorities, who regarded it as an erroneous form of Buddhism. However, as a religion of the Western peoples (Bactrians, Sogdians) it was not outlawed, provided that it remained confined to them not spreading among Chinese. In 731 a Manichaean priest was asked by the current Chinese emperor to make a summary of Manichaean religious doctrines, so that he wrote the Compendium of the Teachings of Mani, the Awakened One of Light, rediscovered at Dunhuang by Aurel Stein (1862–1943); in this text Mani is interpreted as an incarnation of Laozi. As time went on, Manichaeism conflicted with Buddhism but appears to have had good relations with the Taoists; an 8th-century version of the Huahujing, a Taoist work polemical towards Buddhism, holds the same view of the Manichaean Compendium, presenting Mani as Laozi's reincarnation among the Western barbarians.

In the early 8th century, Manichaeism became the official religion of the Uyghur Khaganate. As Uyghurs were traditional allies of the Chinese, also supporting the Tang during the An Lushan Rebellion at the half of the century, the Tangs' attitude towards the religion relaxed and under the Uyghur Khaganate's patronage Manichaean churches prospered in Nanjing, Yangzhou, Jingzhou, Shaoxing and other places. When the Uyghur Khaganate was defeated by the Kyrgyz in 840, Manichaeism's fortune vanished as anti-foreign sentiment arose among the Chinese. Manichaean properties were confiscated, the temples were destroyed, the scriptures were burnt and the clergy was laicised, or killed, as was the case of seventy nuns who were executed at the Tang capital Chang'an. In the same years all foreign religions were suppressed under Emperor Wuzong of Tang (840–846).

The religion never recovered from the persecutions, but it has persisted as a distinct syncretic, and underground movement at particularly in southeastern China. Manichaean sects historically have been known for resurfacing from their hiding from time to time, supporting peasant rebellions. The Song dynasty (960–1279) continued to suppress Manichaeism as a subversive cult. In 1120, a rebellion led by Fang La was believed to have been caused by Manichaeans, and widespread crackdown of unauthorised religious assemblies took place. During the subsequent Mongol Yuan dynasty (1271–1368), foreign religions were generally granted freedom, but the following Ming dynasty (1368–1644) renewed discriminations against them. Despite this, small Manichaean communities are still active in modern China. Manichaeism is thought to have exerted a strong influence on some of the currents of popular sects, such as that which gave rise to Xiantiandao.

Zoroastrianism

Zoroastrianism ( Suǒluōyàsīdéjiào or  Xiānjiào, "Heaven worship teaching"; also named  Bōsījiào, "Persian teaching"; also  Bàihuǒjiào, "fire-worshippers' transmission"; also  Báitóujiào, "old age teaching") was first introduced in northern China in the 4th century, or even earlier, by the Sogdians, and it developed through three stages. Some scholars provide evidences that would attest the existence of Zoroastrianism, or broader Iranian religion, in China, as early as the 2nd and 1st century BCE. Worship of Mithra was indeed performed at the court of Emperor Wu of Han (157-87 BCE).

The first phase of Zoroastrianism in China started in the Wei and Jin dynasties of the Northern and Southern dynasties' period (220–589), when Sogdian Zoroastrians advanced into China. They did not proselytise among Chinese, and from this period there are only two known fragments of Zoroastrian literature, both in Sogdian language. One of them is a translation of the Ashem Vohu recovered by Aurel Stein in Dunhuang and now preserved at the British Museum. The Tang dynasty (618–907) prohibited Chinese people to profess Zoroastrianism, so it remained primarily a religion of foreign residents. Before the An Lushan Rebellion (756–763), Sogdians and Chinese lived as segregated ethnic groups; however, after the rebellion intermarriage became common and the Sogdians were gradually assimilated by the Chinese.

In addition to the Sogdian Zoroastrians, after the fall of the Sasanid dynasty (651), through the 7th and 8th centuries Iranian Zoroastrians, including aristocrats and magi, migrated to northern China. Fleeing the Islamisation of Iran, they settled in the cities of Chang'an, Luoyang, Kaifeng, Yangzhou, Taiyuan and elsewhere. In the Tang period it is attested that there were at least twenty-nine Zoroastrian fire temples in northern urban centres. During the great purge of foreign religions under Emperor Wuzong of Tang also Zoroastrianism was target of suppression.

The second phase of Zoroastrianism in China was in the Five Dynasties and Ten Kingdoms period (907–960), and saw the development of an indigenous Chinese Zoroastrianism that lasted until modern times. During this period, the gods of Sogdian Zoroastrianism were assimilated into the Chinese folk religion; Zoroastrian currents of the Chinese folk religion were increasingly practised by the Chinese and survived until the 1940s. Chinese Zoroastrian temples were witnessed to be active in Hanyang, Hubei until those years.

The third phase started in the 18th century when Parsi merchants sailed from Mumbai to Macau, Hong Kong and Guangzhou. Parsi cemeteries and fire temples were built in these coastal cities, in east China. The Parsis were expelled when the CCP rose to power in 1949. A Parsi fire temple was built in Shanghai in 1866, and was destroyed during the Cultural Revolution. Starting in the 1980s there has been a new wave of Parsis settling in China.

In Classical Chinese, Zoroastrianism was first referred to as  Hútiān, which in the Wei-Jin period became the appellation of all northern nomads. In the early Tang, a new character was invented specifically for Zoroastrianism,  xiān, meaning the "worship of Heaven". Curiously, in the Far East the Zoroastrians were regarded as "Heaven worshippers" rather than "fire worshippers" (in Japanese the name of the religion is Kenkyō, the same as in Chinese). At the time it was rare for the Chinese to create a character for a foreign religion, and this is an evidence of the effect of Zoroastrians in Tang Chinese society.

Japanese Shinto

Between 1931 and 1945, with the establishment of the Japanese-controlled Manchukuo ("Manchu Country") in northeast China (Manchuria), many shrines of State Shinto (Chinese: shénshè, Japanese: jinja) were established in the area.

They were part of the project of cultural assimilation of Manchuria into Japan, or Japanisation, the same policy that was being applied to Taiwan. With the end of the Second World War and of the Manchu Country (Manchukuo) in 1945, and the return of Manchuria to China under the Kuomintang, Shinto was abolished and the shrines were destroyed.

During Japanese rule also many Japanese new religions, or independent Shinto sects, proselytised in Manchuria establishing hundreds of congregations. Most of the missions belonged to the Omoto teaching, the Tenri teaching and the Konko teaching of Shinto.

Anti-metaphysical and anti-theistic thoughts

The government of the People's Republic of China officially espouses state atheism, and has conducted antireligious campaigns to this end. Many churches, temples and mosques were destroyed during the Cultural Revolution, which also criminalized the possession of religious texts. Monks were also beaten or killed. As such, China has the most atheists in the world. 
 
China has a history of schools of thought not relying upon conceptions of an absolute, or putting absolutes into question. Mark Juergensmeyer observes that Confucianism itself is primarily pragmatic and humanist, in it the "thisworldliness" being the priority. Given the differences between Western and Chinese concepts of "religion", Hu Shih stated in the 1920s what has been translated in Western terminology as "China is a country without religion and the Chinese are a people who are not bound by religious superstitions".

The Classic of Poetry contains several catechistic poems in the Decade of Dang questioning the authority or existence of the God of Heaven. Later philosophers such as Xun Zi, Fan Zhen, Han Fei, Zhang Zai, and Wang Fuzhi also criticised religious practices prevalent during their times. During the efflorescence of Buddhism in the Southern and Northern dynasties, Fan Zhen wrote On the Extinction of the Soul ( Shénmièlùn) to criticise ideas of body-soul dualism, samsara and karma. He wrote that the soul is merely an effect or function of the body, and that there is no soul without the body—after the death and destruction of the body. He considered that cause-and-effect relationships claimed to be evidence of karma were merely the result of coincidence and bias. For this, he was exiled by Emperor Wu of Liang (502–549).

See also 

 Ancestral shrine
 Chinese ancestral worship
 Chinese Buddhism
 Chinese folk religion
 Chinese lists of cults
 Chinese ritual mastery traditions
 Chinese temples
 Confucianism
 Freedom of religion in China
 Taoism
 Three teachings
 Zhizha

Other
 Chinese folk religion in Southeast Asia
 Northeast China folk religion
 Religion in Inner Mongolia
 Religion in Hong Kong
 Religion in Macau
 Religion in Northeast China
 Religion in Taiwan

Notes

References

Citations

Sources 

 . Available at the author's website: Joseph Adler Department of Religious Studies, Kenyon College.
 .
 
 
 
 
 
 
 
 
  Various reprints.
 
 
 
  6 volumes. Online: Les classiques des sciences sociales, Université du Québec à Chicoutimi; Scribd: Vol. 1, Vol. 2, Vol. 3, Vol. 4, Vol. 5, Vol. 6.
  Volume I: The Ancient Eurasian World and the Celestial Pivot, Volume II: Representations and Identities of High Powers in Neolithic and Bronze China, Volume III: Terrestrial and Celestial Transformations in Zhou and Early-Imperial China.
 
 
 . Consulted HAL-SHS version, pages 1–56.
 
  Preprint from The Oxford Handbook of Religious Conversion, 2014.
 
 
 .
 
 .
 
 
 
 
   (online),  (print).
 
 
 
 
 
 
 
 
 
 
 
 
 
 
 
 
 
 
 
 
 
 
 
 
 
 
  Two volumes: 1) A-L; 2) L-Z.
 
 
  
 
 
 
 
 
 
 . Extracts in The Chinese Cosmos: Basic Concepts.

Further reading 

 
 
 Sterckx, Roel. Ways of Heaven. An Introduction to Chinese Thought. New York: Basic Books, 2019.

External links 

 Chinese Buddhist Association
 China Confucian Philosophy
 China Confucian Religion
 China Confucian Temples
 Holy Confucian Church of China
 Chinese Taoist Association
 Chinese Folk Temples' Management Association 

Academic
 Living in the Chinese Cosmos, Asia for Educators, Columbia University.
 China Zentrum, Germany-based institute for research on religion in China

Media
 Euraxess Science Slam: Meihuaquan and Community Life in North China
 eRenlai Ricci: The boundary between religion and the state in China by Prof. Lagerwey
 GBTimes: The Debate: Insight into religion in modern China (part 1)—Part 2
 Berkeley Center: Ritual Economy and Religious  in Rural Southeast China
 Berkeley Center: Secularization Theory and the Study of Chinese Religions
 Berkeley Center: Understanding Contemporary Religious Pluralism in China

 
Religious demographics
Politics of China

mt:Reliġjon fiċ-Ċina